= National Register of Historic Places listings in Middlesex County, New Jersey =

Location of Middlesex County in New Jersey

List of the National Register of Historic Places listings in Middlesex County, New Jersey

Contents: Counties and communities in New Jersey
Atlantic – Bergen (Closter, Franklin Lakes, Ridgewood, Saddle River, Wyckoff) – Burlington – Camden – Cape May – Cumberland – Essex – Gloucester – Hudson – Hunterdon – Mercer – Middlesex – Monmouth – Morris – Ocean – Passaic – Salem – Somerset – Sussex – Union – Warren

This is intended to be a complete list of properties and districts listed on the National Register of Historic Places in Middlesex County, New Jersey. Latitude and longitude coordinates of the sites listed on this page may be displayed in an online map.

This National Park Service list is complete through NPS recent listings posted April 24, 2026.

| | Name on the Register | Image | Date listed | Location | City or town | Description |
|---|---|---|---|---|---|---|
| 1 | Thomas I. Agnew House | Thomas I. Agnew House | May 13, 1982 (#82003281) | Memorial Pkwy. 40°29′03″N 74°25′13″W | New Brunswick | |
| 2 | Ayers–Allen House | Ayers–Allen House | September 5, 1985 (#85002002) | 16 Durham Avenue; 40°32′40″N 74°21′52″W | Metuchen | |
| 3 | Barron Library | Barron Library | November 11, 1977 (#77000886) | 582 Rahway Avenue; 40°33′40″N 74°16′25″W | Woodbridge | The Barron Arts Center |
| 4 | James Bishop House | James Bishop House | July 12, 1976 (#76001162) | College Avenue; 40°30′11″N 74°27′00″W | New Brunswick | |
| 5 | Buccleuch Mansion | Buccleuch Mansion | April 13, 1977 (#77000883) | 200 College Ave., Buccleuch Park; 40°30′18″N 74°27′37″W | New Brunswick | Built 1739 |
| 6 | Cedar Brook Park | Cedar Brook Park | August 28, 2007 (#07000878) | Roughly bounded Steel Ave., Arlington Ave., Park Ave., Rose St. and Laramie Rd., Kenyon Ave., Parkside Rd. 40°36′05″N 74°24′25″W | South Plainfield | Primarily in Plainfield, Union County |
| 7 | Cedar Grove School | Cedar Grove School | October 24, 1976 (#76001165) | 4216 CR 516; 40°24′29″N 74°16′15″W | Old Bridge Township | The Thomas Warne Museum |
| 8 | Christ Episcopal Church | Christ Episcopal Church | July 28, 1989 (#89000994) | 5 Paterson St. 40°29′44″N 74°26′37″W | New Brunswick | Known as Christ Church |
| 9 | Cranbury Historic District | Cranbury Historic District | September 18, 1980 (#80002502) | Main and Prospect streets; Maplewood and Scott avenues; Bunker Hill Road; Symmes Court; Westminster, Park and Wesley places 40°18′47″N 74°30′55″W | Cranbury | Includes Old Cranbury School |
| 10 | Delaware and Raritan Canal | Delaware and Raritan Canal | May 11, 1973 (#73001105) | Follows the Delaware River to Trenton, then E to New Brunswick; 40°32′40″N 75°02′50″W | New Brunswick | Built 1830–34 |
| 11 | Demarest House | Demarest House | August 10, 1977 (#77000884) | 542 George St. 40°30′07″N 74°26′47″W | New Brunswick | Built in 1867, now the Center on Violence Against Women and Children, Rutgers University |
| 12 | Dutch Reformed Church | Dutch Reformed Church | September 27, 1988 (#88001703) | 160 Neilson Street; 40°29′42″N 74°26′32″W | New Brunswick | Known as the First Reformed Church of New Brunswick |
| 13 | Thomas A. Edison Memorial Tower | Thomas A. Edison Memorial Tower | November 30, 1979 (#79001505) | 37 Christie St. 40°33′47″N 74°20′22″W | Edison | Location of Edison's Menlo Park Laboratory, 1876-86. Memorial tower built 1938. |
| 14 | Ensley-Mount-Buckalew House | Ensley-Mount-Buckalew House | September 12, 1979 (#79001507) | Buckalew Ave. 40°20′50″N 74°26′03″W | Jamesburg | Known as Buckelew Mansion or Lakeview |
| 15 | First Presbyterian Church and Cemetery | First Presbyterian Church and Cemetery | May 2, 2008 (#08000363) | 600 Rahway Avenue; 40°33′43″N 74°16′26″W | Woodbridge | |
| 16 | Ephraim Fitz-Randolph House | Ephraim Fitz-Randolph House | March 14, 1973 (#73001114) | 430 S. Randolphville Road; 40°32′56″N 74°27′45″W | Piscataway | |
| 17 | Mary Wilkins Freeman House | Mary Wilkins Freeman House | January 17, 2020 (#100004886) | 207 Lake Avenue; 40°32′12″N 74°21′50″W | Metuchen | Home of Mary Eleanor Wilkins Freeman |
| 18 | Goldman House | Goldman House | October 1, 2010 (#10000813) | 143 School St. 40°31′47″N 74°26′04″W | Piscataway | At the Ferrer Colony |
| 19 | Great Beds Light | Great Beds Light | May 29, 2008 (#08000467) | Offshore in Raritan Bay at NJ-NY line approx. 1 mi. E. of South Amboy; 40°29′12″N 74°15′11″W | South Amboy | |
| 20 | Henry Guest House | Henry Guest House | May 24, 1976 (#76001163) | 58 Livingston Avenue; 40°29′29″N 74°26′45″W | New Brunswick | Built 1760 |
| 21 | Gulick House | Gulick House | July 3, 1979 (#79001509) | W of Monmouth Junction on Raymond Rd. 40°22′48″N 74°35′27″W | Monmouth Junction | Known as Red Maple Farm |
| 22 | G. W. Helme Snuff Mill Historic District | G. W. Helme Snuff Mill Historic District | August 15, 1980 (#80002503) | Irregular pattern along Main Street; 40°22′39″N 74°25′31″W | Helmetta | |
| 23 | Holmes–Tallman House | Holmes–Tallman House | September 12, 1979 (#79001508) | NW of Jamesburg at the corner of Cranbury-South River Road and Brown's Corner Road; 40°22′15″N 74°27′30″W | Monroe Township | |
| 24 | Homestead Farm at Oak Ridge | Homestead Farm at Oak Ridge | October 25, 1995 (#95001185) | Jct. of Oak Ridge Rd. and Feather Bed Ln., Clark and Edison Townships; 40°36′28″N 74°20′56″W | Clark | |
| 25 | George Inness House | George Inness House | October 10, 1979 (#79003250) | 313 Convery Blvd. 40°30′50″N 74°17′16″W | Perth Amboy | The Eagleswood Mansion demolished 1993 |
| 26 | Ivy Hall | Ivy Hall | May 27, 1971 (#71000510) | 1225 River Road; 40°30′45″N 74°27′45″W | Piscataway | Known as Cornelius Low House |
| 27 | Levi D. Jarrard House | Levi D. Jarrard House | April 22, 1982 (#82003282) | George St., Douglass College campus 40°29′11″N 74°26′16″W | New Brunswick | Known as College Hall, Douglass Campus, Rutgers University |
| 28 | William H. Johnson House | William H. Johnson House | July 12, 2006 (#06000560) | 52 Welton Street; 40°29′22″N 74°26′38″W | New Brunswick | The house (c. 1872) is named for William H. Johnson (born 1829), the original owner who lived here until his death, February 26, 1904 with his wife Sarah and daughter Adilade. |
| 29 | Edward S. Kearney House | Edward S. Kearney House | April 6, 1979 (#79001504) | NJ 18; 40°28′51″N 74°24′45″W | East Brunswick | |
| 30 | Lawrence Kearny House | Lawrence Kearny House | May 28, 1976 (#76001166) | 63 Catalpa St. 40°30′04″N 74°16′21″W | Perth Amboy | |
| 31 | King Block | King Block | May 26, 1988 (#88000644) | 316-324 Memorial Pkwy. 40°29′44″N 74°26′26″W | New Brunswick | Demolished early 1990s |
| 32 | King's Highway Historic District | King's Highway Historic District | December 21, 2000 (#00001493) | NJ 27, US 206; 40°22′21″N 74°37′06″W | South Brunswick | Extends into Mercer and Somerset Counties |
| 33 | Kingston Mill Historic District | Kingston Mill Historic District | April 10, 1986 (#86000707) | Roughly bounded by Herrontown, River, Princeton-Kingston Roads; 40°22′28″N 74°37′34″W | South Brunswick | Extends into Mercer and Somerset Counties, includes Kingston Bridge |
| 34 | Kingston Village Historic District | Kingston Village Historic District | January 11, 1990 (#89002163) | Roughly NJ 27 from Raymond Rd. to Delaware & Raritan Canal, Church St., Laurel Ave., Heathcote Brook Rd., & Academy St. 40°22′33″N 74°36′48″W | Kingston | Extends into Somerset County |
| 35 | Laing House of Plainfield Plantation | Laing House of Plainfield Plantation | October 27, 1988 (#88002124) | 1707 Woodland Ave. 40°34′57″N 74°23′17″W | Edison | |
| 36 | Livingston Avenue Historic District | Livingston Avenue Historic District | February 16, 1996 (#96000072) | Area surrounding Livingston Avenue between Hale and Morris Streets; 40°29′21″N 74°26′53″W | New Brunswick | Includes the Henry Guest House |
| 37 | Livingston Homestead | Livingston Homestead | March 20, 2002 (#02000215) | 81 Harrison Ave. 40°30′15″N 74°26′07″W | Highland Park | Livingston Manor Historic District |
| 38 | Livingston Manor Historic District | Livingston Manor Historic District | July 7, 2004 (#04000672) | Roughly bounded by Cleveland, Grant, Harrison, Lawrence, Lincoln, Madison and N. 2nd Aves. and River Rd. 40°30′05″N 74°26′17″W | Highland Park | |
| 39 | Main Post Office | Main Post Office | July 18, 1984 (#84002731) | 86 Bayard St. 40°29′36″N 74°26′47″W | New Brunswick | |
| 40 | Metlar House | Metlar House | March 7, 1973 (#73001115) | 1281 River Road; 40°30′45″N 74°27′25″W | Piscataway | The Metlar–Bodine House Museum, originally part of the community at Raritan Landing |
| 41 | Metuchen Borough Hall | Metuchen Borough Hall | May 14, 2001 (#01000503) | 500 Main Street; 40°32′38″N 74°21′47″W | Metuchen | Demolished 2001–02 |
| 42 | Middlesex Avenue–Woodwild Park Historic District | Middlesex Avenue–Woodwild Park Historic District | July 31, 2017 (#100001396) | Middlesex, Oak, Linden, E. Chestnut, Maple, Elm, Highland & Hillside Aves., Library Place, Clarendon Ct., Pleasant Place, 40°32′47″N 74°21′32″W | Metuchen | |
| 43 | Milltown India Rubber Company | Milltown India Rubber Company | February 13, 1986 (#86000216) | 40 Washington Ave. 40°27′10″N 74°26′06″W | Milltown | |
| 44 | National Musical String Company | National Musical String Company | April 20, 1982 (#82003283) | 120 Georges Rd. 40°28′33″N 74°26′52″W | New Brunswick | |
| 45 | New Brunswick Station | New Brunswick Station | June 22, 1984 (#84002732) | French St. and Albany St. 40°29′47″N 74°26′47″W | New Brunswick | Built 1903 by Pennsylvania Railroad |
| 46 | New Jersey Hall | New Jersey Hall | February 24, 1975 (#75001144) | 73 Hamilton St. Rutgers University; 40°29′58″N 74°26′51″W | New Brunswick | Located on the Voorhees Mall |
| 47 | Old Bridge Historic District | Old Bridge Historic District | June 29, 1977 (#77000882) | River Road; Kossman, Pine, Chestnut, Main, Everson, Squire, Maple, and Oak streets; Rutgers Place; 40°24′53″N 74°21′54″W | East Brunswick | |
| 48 | Old Cranbury School | Old Cranbury School | June 21, 1971 (#71000508) | 23 N. Main Street; 40°18′42″N 74°31′02″W | Cranbury | |
| 49 | Old Queens, Rutgers University | Old Queens, Rutgers University | May 11, 1976 (#76001164) | 83 Somerset Street; 40°29′56″N 74°26′47″W | New Brunswick | Built 1809–1825. Oldest building at Rutgers University, also part of Queens Campus |
| 50 | Old School Baptist Church and Cemetery | Old School Baptist Church and Cemetery | January 7, 1992 (#91001926) | 64-66 Main St. 40°27′01″N 74°22′54″W | South River | |
| 51 | Isaac Onderdonk House | Isaac Onderdonk House | October 30, 1973 (#73001116) | 685 River Road; 40°31′57″N 74°29′36″W | Piscataway | Part of Road Up Raritan Historic District |
| 52 | Perth Amboy City Hall and Surveyor General's Office | Perth Amboy City Hall and Surveyor General's Office | January 21, 1981 (#81000394) | 260 High Street; 40°30′23″N 74°15′57″W | Perth Amboy | |
| 53 | Perth Amboy Ferry Slip | Perth Amboy Ferry Slip | November 28, 1978 (#78001773) | Smith St. 40°30′25″N 74°15′44″W | Perth Amboy | Former B&O ferry port to Tottenville, Staten Island |
| 54 | Perth Amboy Public Library | Perth Amboy Public Library | September 24, 2025 (#100012279) | 196 Jefferson Street; 40°30′38″N 74°16′14″W | Perth Amboy | A Carnegie library. |
| 55 | Perth Amboy Station | Perth Amboy Station | June 22, 1984 (#84002735) | Between Smith and Market Sts. 40°30′34″N 74°16′26″W | Perth Amboy | Built 1928 |
| 56 | Poile Zedek Synagogue | Poile Zedek Synagogue | October 25, 1995 (#95001189) | 145 Neilson Street; 40°29′39″N 74°26′31″W | New Brunswick | |
| 57 | Princeton Nurseries Historic District | Princeton Nurseries Historic District | August 28, 2018 (#08000899) | Generally along Mapleton Road and Ridge Road; 40°22′07″N 74°36′55″W | South Brunswick | Extends into Plainsboro |
| 58 | Proprietary House | Proprietary House | February 24, 1971 (#71000509) | 139-151 Kearny Avenue; 40°30′44″N 74°16′10″W | Perth Amboy | |
| 59 | Queens Campus, Rutgers University | Queens Campus, Rutgers University | July 2, 1973 (#73001113) | Bounded by College Avenue and George, Hamilton, and Somerset Streets; 40°29′54″N 74°26′46″W | New Brunswick | Includes Old Queens (1809), Van Nest Hall (1845), Daniel S. Schanck Observatory (1865), Geology Hall (1872), Kirkpatrick Chapel (1873), Winants Hall (1890). |
| 60 | Randolphville Bridge | Randolphville Bridge | September 17, 1999 (#99001169) | Near 618 S. Randolphville Road; 40°32′22″N 74°27′11″W | Piscataway | Built 1937 |
| 61 | Raritan Landing Archeological District | Raritan Landing Archeological District | August 10, 1979 (#79001506) | Johnson Park; 40°30′45″N 74°27′45″W | Piscataway | Excavations in conjunction with construction of Route 18, extends into Highland Park |
| 62 | Road Up Raritan Historic District | Road Up Raritan Historic District | September 18, 1997 (#97001146) | Along River Road, from Ellis Parkway to 899 River Road; 40°31′35″N 74°29′29″W | Piscataway | Includes Isaac Onderdonk House and Matthias Smock House |
| 63 | Roosevelt Hospital | Roosevelt Hospital | March 5, 2002 (#02000109) | 1 Roosevelt Drive; 40°33′04″N 74°20′16″W | Edison | |
| 64 | Rutgers Preparatory School | Rutgers Preparatory School | July 18, 1975 (#75001145) | 101 Somerset Street; 40°29′52″N 74°26′50″W | New Brunswick | Designed and built by architect Nicholas Wyckoff, former home (1830–1963) of Rutgers Preparatory School, the oldest independent school in New Jersey, established 1766. Building now known as Alexander Johnston Hall, Rutgers University. |
| 65 | Saint Mary of Mount Virgin Roman Catholic Church | Saint Mary of Mount Virgin Roman Catholic Church | November 3, 2010 (#10000877) | 190 Sandford St. 40°29′02″N 74°26′59″W | New Brunswick | |
| 66 | St. Mary's Church | St. Mary's Church | December 10, 2003 (#03001276) | Jct. of Jackson St. and Whitehead Ave. 40°26′59″N 74°22′40″W | South River | |
| 67 | Saint Peter the Apostle Church | Saint Peter the Apostle Church | November 25, 2005 (#05001332) | 94 Somerset St. 40°29′52″N 74°26′46″W | New Brunswick | |
| 68 | St. Peter's Episcopal Church | St. Peter's Episcopal Church | May 12, 1977 (#77000885) | Rector and Gordon Sts. 40°30′14″N 74°15′57″W | Perth Amboy | |
| 69 | St. Peter's Church and Buildings | St. Peter's Church and Buildings | October 10, 1979 (#79003251) | Main Street and DeVoe Avenue; 40°23′29″N 74°23′24″W | Spotswood | |
| 70 | Sayre and Fisher Reading Room | Sayre and Fisher Reading Room | September 12, 1979 (#79001511) | Main St. and River Rd. 40°28′16″N 74°21′19″W | Sayreville | |
| 71 | Short Hills Battlefield Historic District | Short Hills Battlefield Historic District | May 9, 2014 (#14000203) | Address Restricted; 40°35′31″N 74°23′31″W | Edison | |
| 72 | Benjamin Shotwell House | Benjamin Shotwell House | June 4, 1987 (#87000875) | 26 Runyon's Lane; 40°32′50″N 74°24′16″W | Edison | |
| 73 | Simpson United Methodist Church | Simpson United Methodist Church | April 6, 1979 (#79001510) | High and Jefferson Streets; 40°30′32″N 74°15′56″W | Perth Amboy | |
| 74 | Six Mile Run Historic District | Six Mile Run Historic District | October 25, 1995 (#95001191) | Roughly bounded by Grouse Road, Amwell Road, Bennetts Lane, New Jersey Route 27, Bunker Hill Road and the Millstone River in Franklin Township, Somerset County; 40°27′19″N 74°30′52″W | North Brunswick | Only the eastern side of the Route 27 Bridge over the Six Mile Run is in Middlesex County. |
| 75 | Matthias Smock House | Matthias Smock House | December 4, 1973 (#73001117) | 851 River Road; 40°31′26″N 74°29′22″W | Piscataway | Part of Road Up Raritan Historic District |
| 76 | Trinity Episcopal Church | Trinity Episcopal Church | May 12, 2004 (#04000431) | 650 Rahway Avenue; 40°33′43″N 74°16′23″W | Woodbridge | Church and Jonathan Singletary Dunham House |
| 77 | United States Post Office | United States Post Office | April 2, 2008 (#08000270) | 360 Main St. 40°32′25″N 74°21′38″W | Metuchen | |
| 78 | Joseph and Minnie White House | Joseph and Minnie White House | October 28, 1988 (#87001763) | 243 Hazelwood Avenue; 40°34′15″N 74°31′12″W | Middlesex | Childhood home of Margaret Bourke-White |
| 79 | John Van Buren Wicoff House | John Van Buren Wicoff House | March 12, 1998 (#98000236) | 641 Plainsboro Rd. 40°20′01″N 74°35′14″W | Plainsboro | |
| 80 | Withington Estate | Withington Estate | September 27, 1984 (#84002740) | Spruce Lane; 40°22′25″N 74°36′32″W | Kingston | Known as Heathcote Farm |
| 81 | Wood Lawn | Wood Lawn | March 8, 1978 (#78001772) | Douglass Campus, Rutgers University; 40°28′54″N 74°25′59″W | New Brunswick | Used by the Eagleton Institute of Politics, Rutgers University |
