= Isaac Onderdonk House =

Historic house in New Jersey, United States

- U.S. National Register of Historic Places
- U.S. Historic district – Contributing property
- New Jersey Register of Historic Places
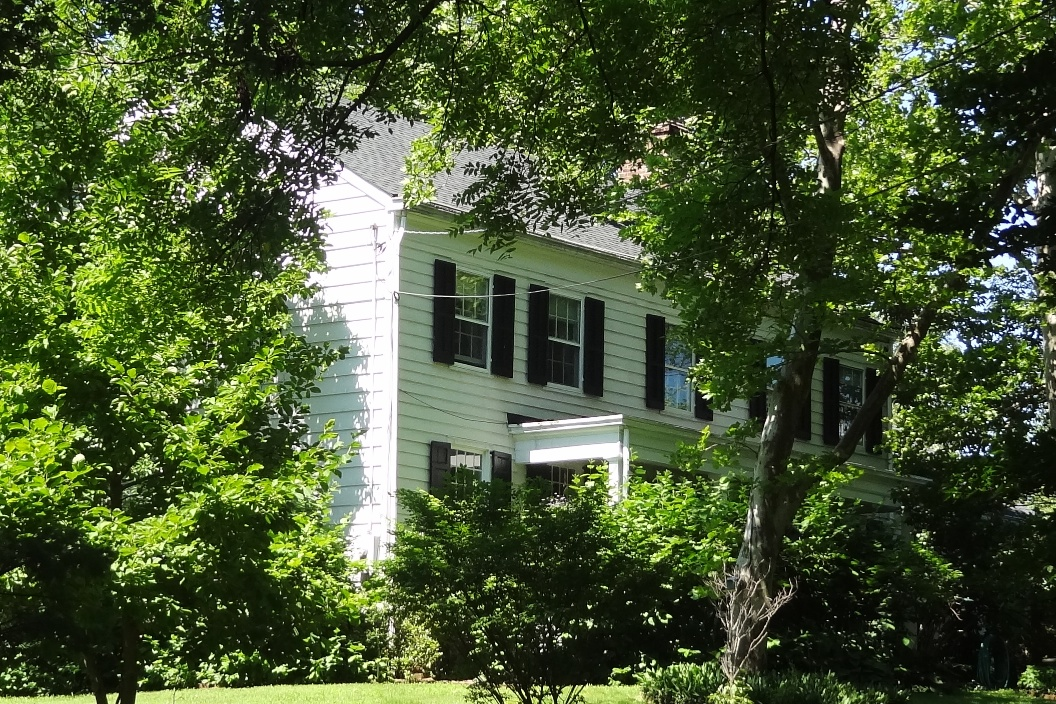

- Location within Middlesex County, New Jersey Location within New Jersey Location within the United States
- Location: 685 River Road, Piscataway, New Jersey
- Coordinates: 40°31′57″N 74°29′36″W
- Area: 5 acres (2.0 ha)
- Built: c. 1750
- Part of: Road Up Raritan Historic District (ID97001146)
- NRHP reference No.: 73001116
- NJRHP No.: 1917

Significant dates
- Added to NRHP: October 30, 1973
- Designated CP: September 18, 1997
- Designated NJRHP: September 6, 1973

The Isaac Onderdonk House, also known as the Walter C. and Julia Meuly House, is a historic house located at 685 River Road in the township of Piscataway in Middlesex County, New Jersey, United States. It was added to the National Register of Historic Places on October 30, 1973, for its significance in architecture. It was listed as a contributing property of the Road Up Raritan Historic District in 1997.

== History and description ==
Isaac Onderdonk and his wife Antie Rierson moved here in 1745. Their son Isaac was born in 1756. He married Sarah Smoch, who lived at the nearby Matthias Smock House. The two-story frame house remained in the Ondeerdonk family until 1929.

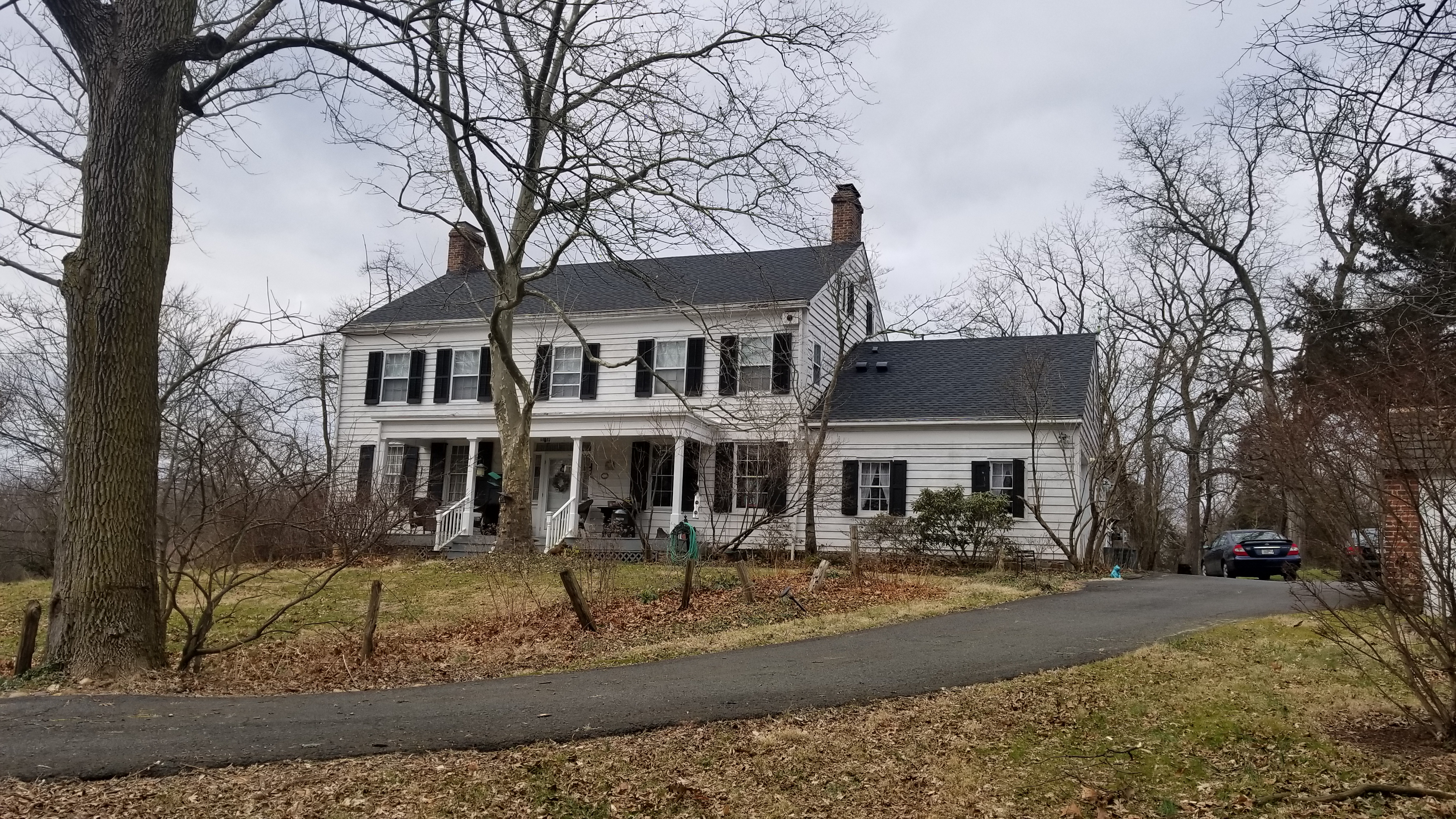
Issac Onderdonk House in 2019

== See also ==
- National Register of Historic Places listings in Middlesex County, New Jersey
- List of the oldest buildings in New Jersey
