= Ayers–Allen House =

Historic house in New Jersey, United States

- U.S. National Register of Historic Places
- New Jersey Register of Historic Places
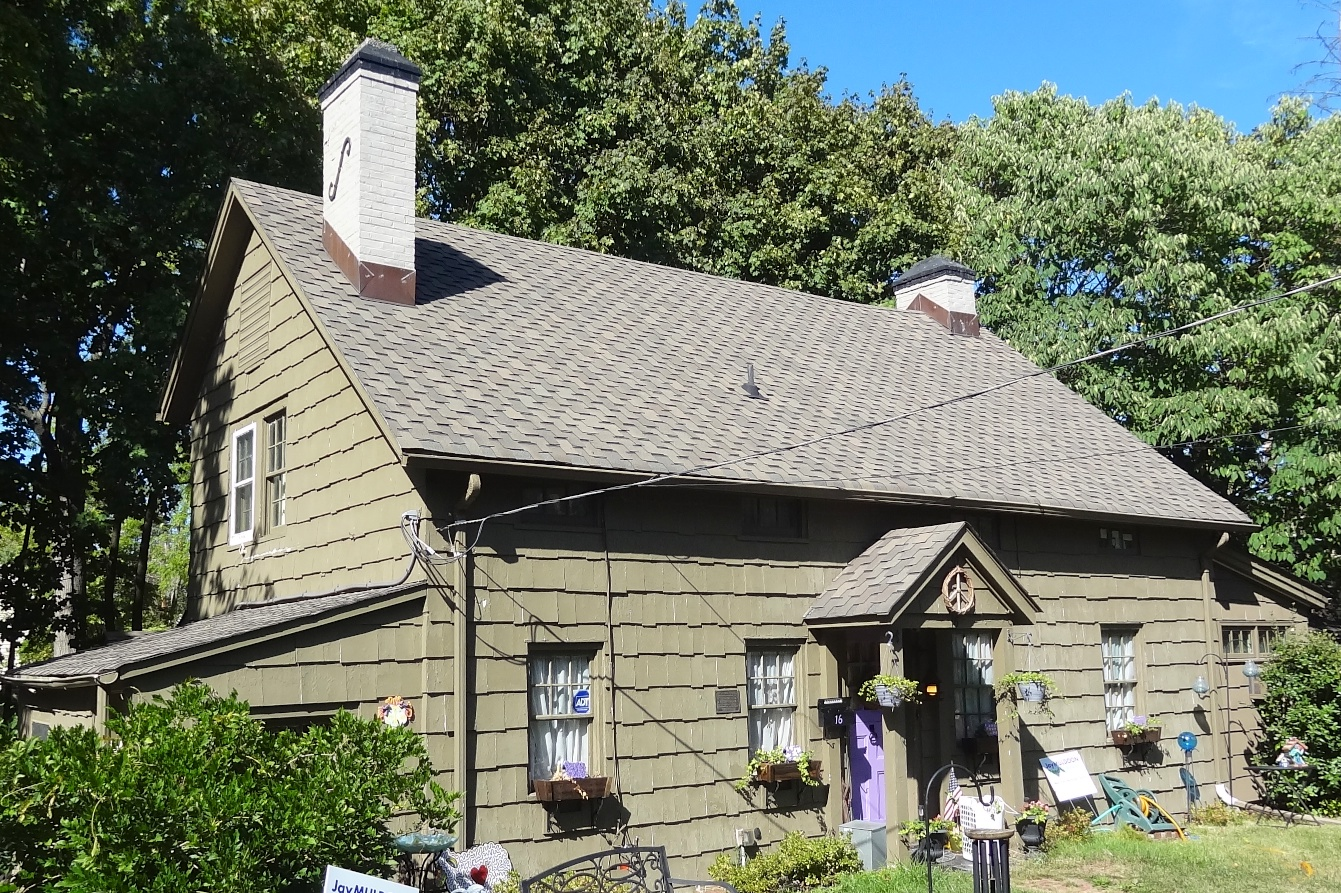

- Location within Middlesex County, New Jersey Location within New Jersey Location within the United States
- Location: 16 Durham Avenue; Metuchen, New Jersey
- Coordinates: 40°32′40″N 74°21′52″W
- Built: c. 1740
- NRHP reference No.: 85002002
- NJRHP No.: 1844

Significant dates
- Added to NRHP: September 5, 1985
- Designated NJRHP: July 7, 1985

The Ayers–Allen House is located at 16 Durham Avenue in the Borough of Metuchen in Middlesex County, New Jersey. The historic house was added to the National Register of Historic Places on September 5, 1985, for its significance in architecture. The c. 1740 building, also known as Allen House Tavern, for its previous function, was built by descendants of early settlers to Woodbridge Township and remained in the family for many generations.

== History and description ==
The frame house was built c. 1740, likely by Jonathan Ayers. The house and property remained in the ownership of the descendants of Obadiah Ayers and his wife Hannah Pike for 184 years. According to the nomination form, it is believed to be the oldest structure in the borough. It is located yards from the site of American Revolutionary War skirmishes. It is believed to have been a stop on the Underground Railroad and to be haunted.

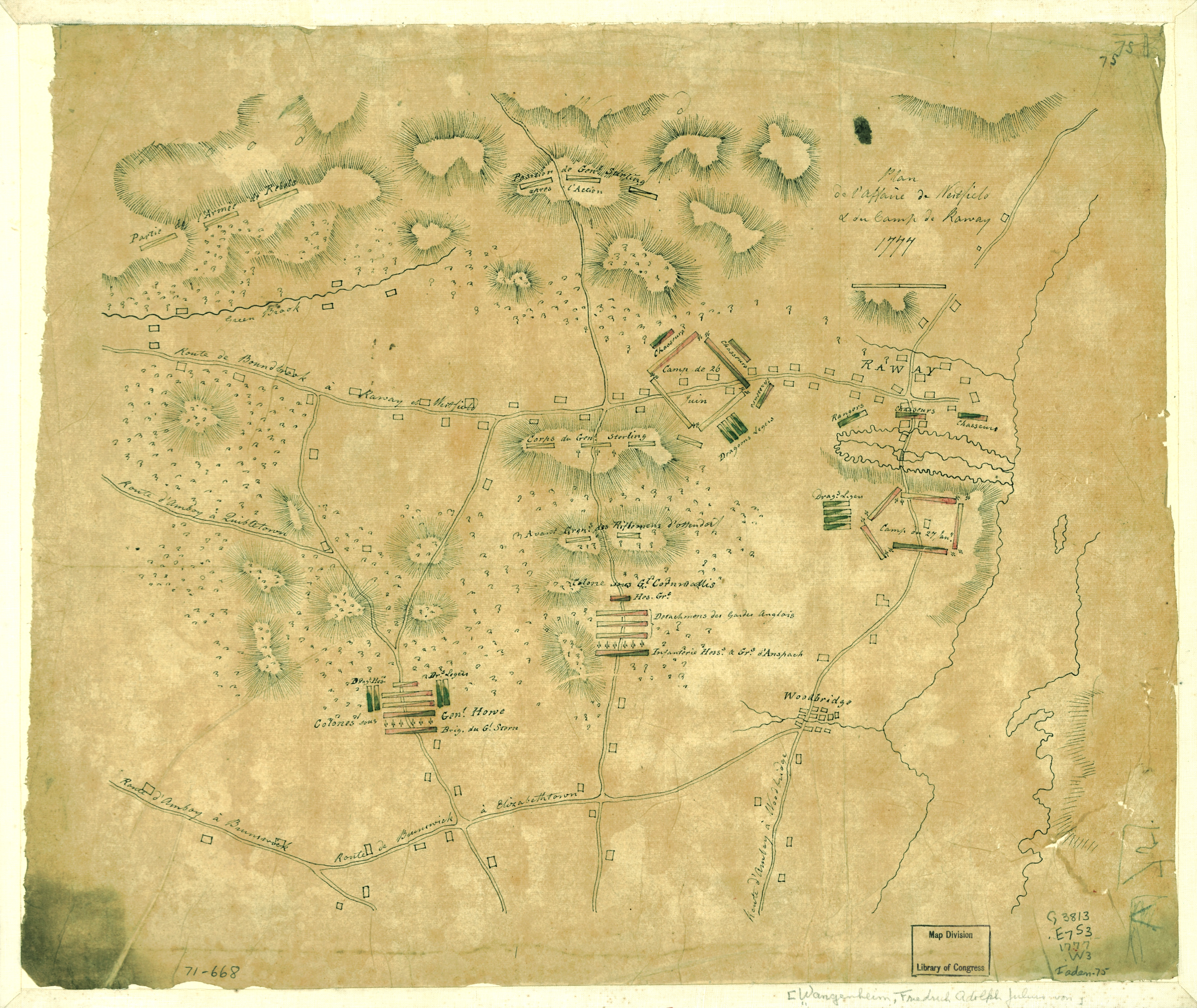
Friedrich Adam Julius von Wangenheim: Map of the area 1777

== See also ==
- National Register of Historic Places listings in Middlesex County, New Jersey
- Homestead Farm at Oak Ridge
- Battle of Short Hills
- List of the oldest buildings in New Jersey
