= King Block =

King Block may refer to:

- King Block (American football) (1929–2014), American football coach
- King Block (New Brunswick, New Jersey), listed on the National Register of Historic Places in Middlesex County, New Jersey
- King Block (Barton, Vermont), listed on the National Register of Historic Places in Orleans County, Vermont
