= Mary Wilkins Freeman House =

- U.S. National Register of Historic Places
- New Jersey Register of Historic Places
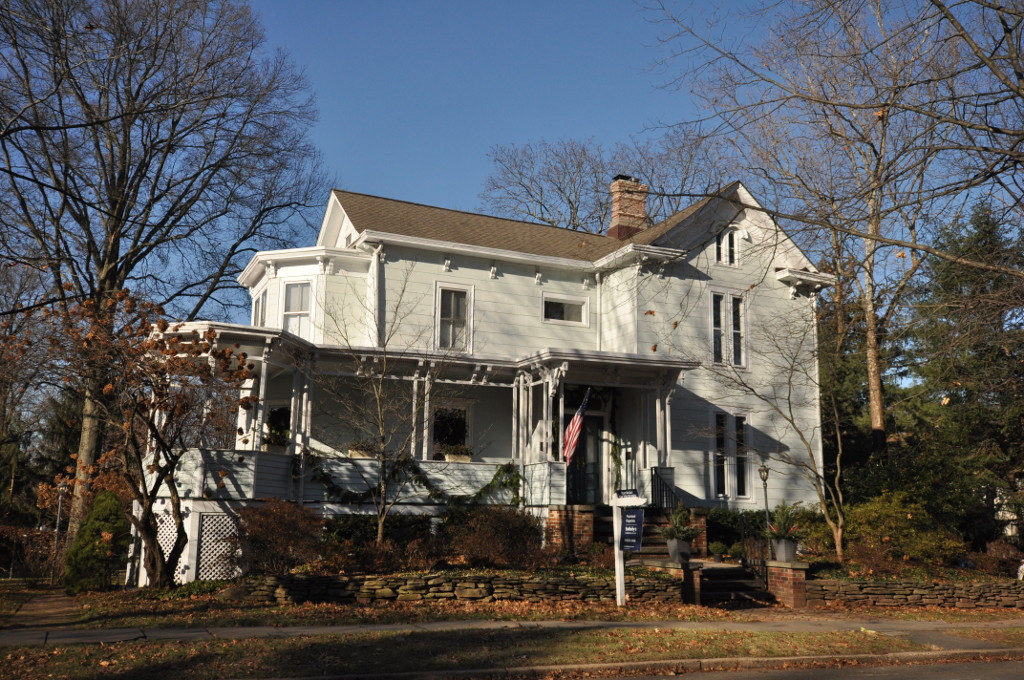

- Location within Middlesex County, New Jersey Location within New Jersey Location within the United States
- Location: 207 Lake Avenue; Metuchen, New Jersey
- Coordinates: 40°32′12″N 74°21′50″W
- Built: 1868
- Architectural style: Italianate
- NRHP reference No.: 100004886
- NJRHP No.: 5594

Significant dates
- Added to NRHP: January 17, 2020
- Designated NJRHP: October 7, 2019

The Mary Wilkins Freeman House is a historic house located at 207 Lake Avenue in the Borough of Metuchen in Middlesex County, New Jersey. It was the home of the author, Mary Eleanor Wilkins Freeman (1852–1930). Built c. 1868, the house was added to the National Register of Historic Places on January 17, 2020, for its significance in literature from 1902 to 1907.

== History and description ==
The house is a two and one-half story frame building with Italianate style, built c. 1868. While renting the house, Mary Wilkins Freeman described it in humor as:

I have a home in Metuchen with twenty-eight doors and five pairs of stairs, otherwise it is quite pretty. I suppose I shall spend most of my time, being naturally of a somewhat undecided turn, trying to decide which door to go in or out of, and what stairs to descend.

She married Dr. Charles Manning Freeman here on January 1, 1902. The couple stayed here until 1907, when they moved into a new house nearby. While here, she wrote about 47 of her works.

== See also ==
- National Register of Historic Places listings in Middlesex County, New Jersey
