= Metuchen Borough Hall =

Town hall and registered historic site in New Jersey, US

- U.S. National Register of Historic Places
- New Jersey Register of Historic Places
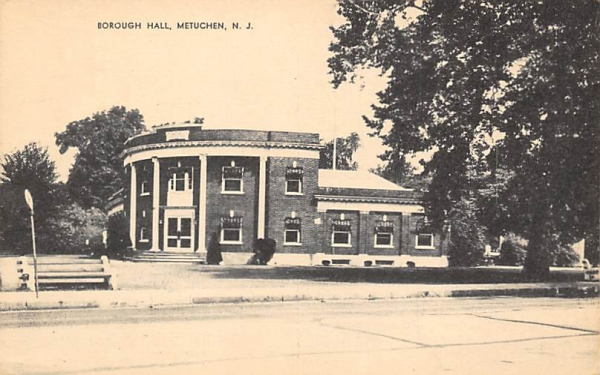
- Postcard image taken within a few years of its construction in 1924

- Location within Middlesex County, New Jersey Location within New Jersey Location within the United States
- Location: 500 Main Street; Metuchen, New Jersey
- Coordinates: 40°32′38″N 74°21′47″W
- Built: 1924
- Architect: Clement W. Fairweather
- Architectural style: Beaux Arts
- Demolished: 2002
- NRHP reference No.: 01000503
- NJRHP No.: 3778

Significant dates
- Added to NRHP: May 5, 2001
- Designated NJRHP: March 23, 1988

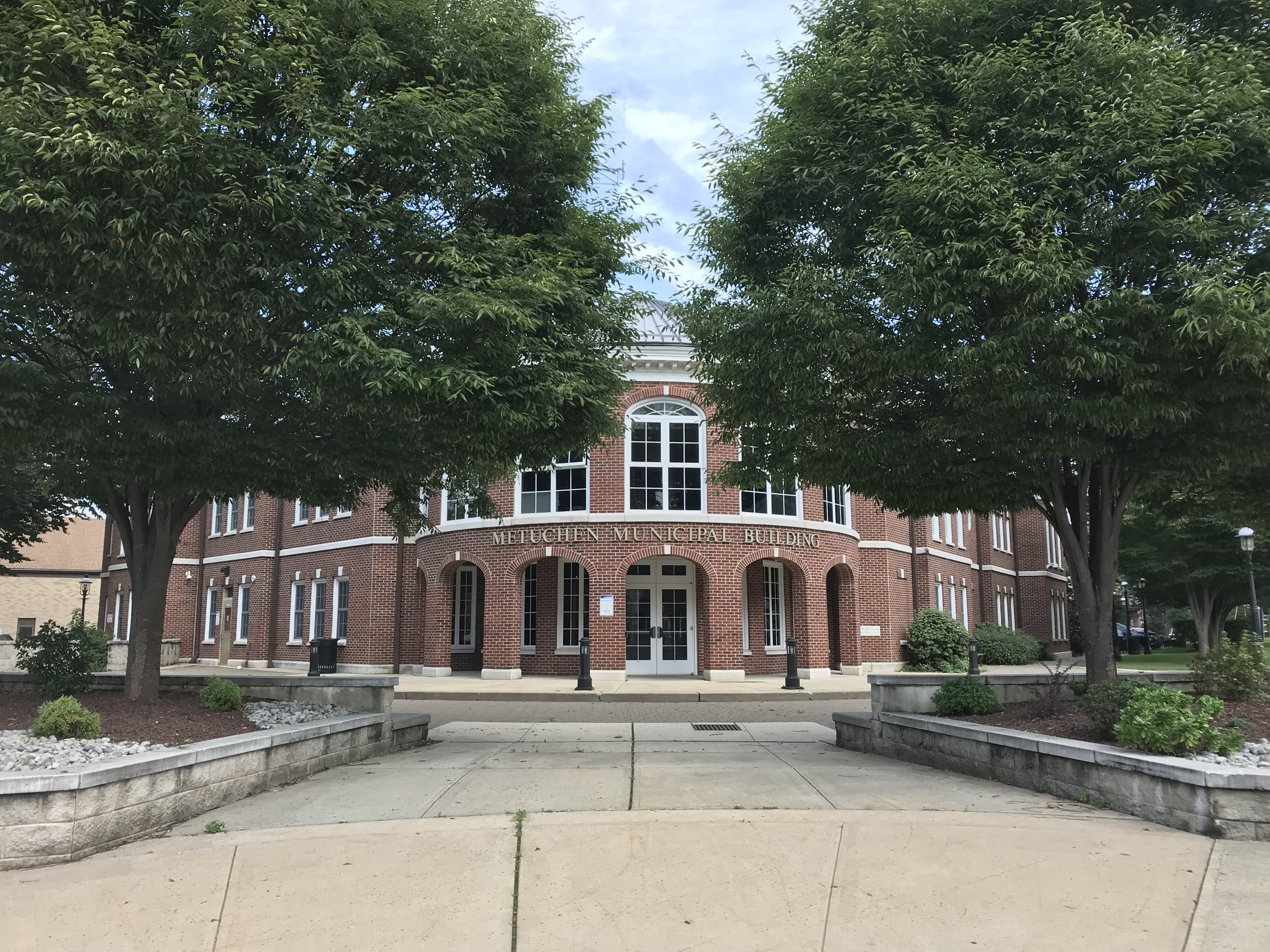
Metuchen Municipal Building in 2018

The Metuchen Municipal Building, located at 500 Main Street, is the town hall for the borough of Metuchen in Middlesex County, New Jersey. The two-story concrete building, with brick facade, was built in 2003 and dedicated on September 1, 2005.

== Historic building ==
The building replaced an earlier structure, the Metuchen Borough Hall, that had been built during the City Beautiful movement in 1924. It was demolished soon after its listing on the New Jersey Register of Historic Places and National Register of Historic Places in 2001. It had been listed due to its significance in architecture and politics/government.

The listing of the original Borough Hall as a historic site was controversial as it was unilaterally submitted by a small community activist group called the "Fairweather Friends" As a result of this listing, lawmakers made changes so that any public building could not be listed on a historic places list unless the governing body of that public building agrees to such a listing. The intent of this legal change was to insure that the entire public and not just one particular group seeking a historic designation is represented when these decisions are made on public buildings.

It was designed by Metuchen architect Clement W. Fairweather and included space for borough offices, a library, and a police station. The two-story building was built of brick using Flemish bond and featured Classical Revival architecture with columns, pilasters, and a decorative stone cartouche with a Classical shield.

== See also ==
- National Register of Historic Places listings in Middlesex County, New Jersey
