= Simpson United Methodist Church =

Historic church in New Jersey, United States

- U.S. National Register of Historic Places
- New Jersey Register of Historic Places
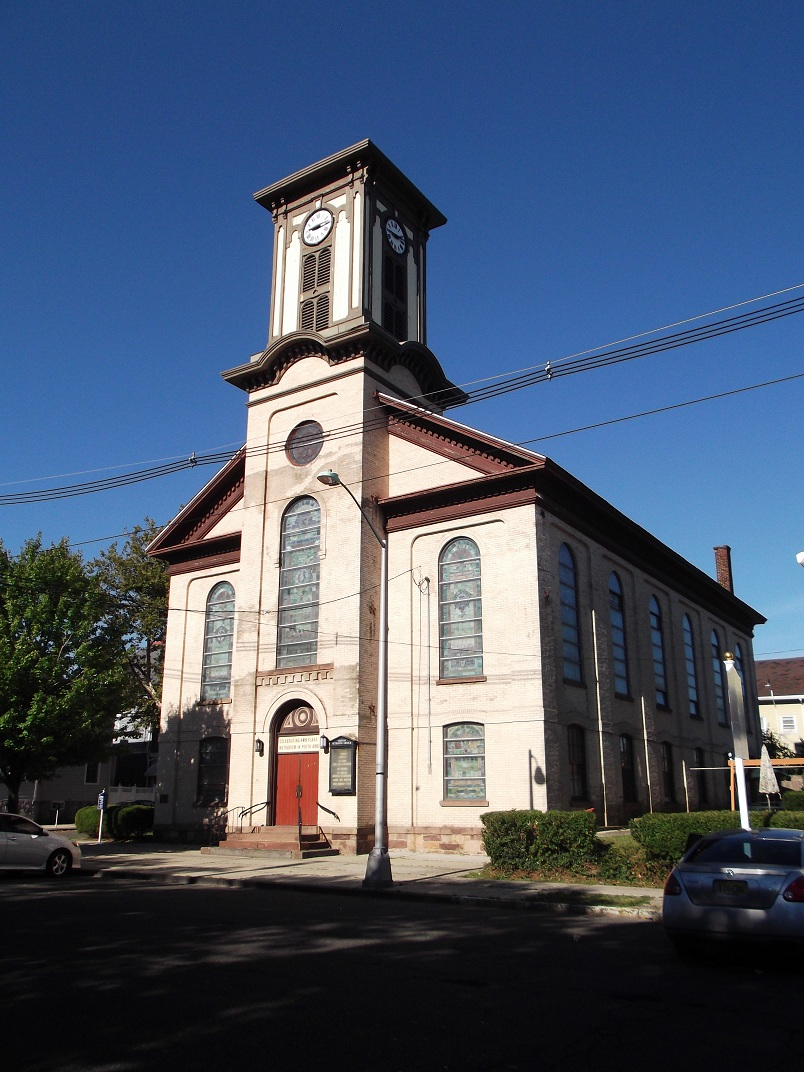

- Location within Middlesex County, New Jersey Location within New Jersey Location within the United States
- Location: High and Jefferson Streets, Perth Amboy, New Jersey
- Coordinates: 40°30′32″N 74°15′56″W
- Built: 1867
- Architect: Charles Graham
- Architectural style: Italianate
- NRHP reference No.: 79001510
- NJRHP No.: 1903

Significant dates
- Added to NRHP: April 06, 1979
- Designated NJRHP: January 21, 1979

The Simpson United Methodist Church is a historic church located at the intersection of High and Jefferson Streets in the city of Perth Amboy in Middlesex County, New Jersey, United States. Completed in 1867, it was added to the National Register of Historic Places on April 6, 1979, for its significance in architecture, communication, and religion.

== History and description ==
Methodism began in the city when on March 26, 1772, Francis Asbury, selected by founder John Wesley, delivered the first Methodist sermon. The Methodist Episcopal Church in Perth Amboy was organized in 1836 and built a frame church in 1838. The current, larger church was started in 1866 and completed in 1867. It was designed by the architect Charles Graham with Italianate style. Since 1870, the steeple features the town clock, owned by the city.

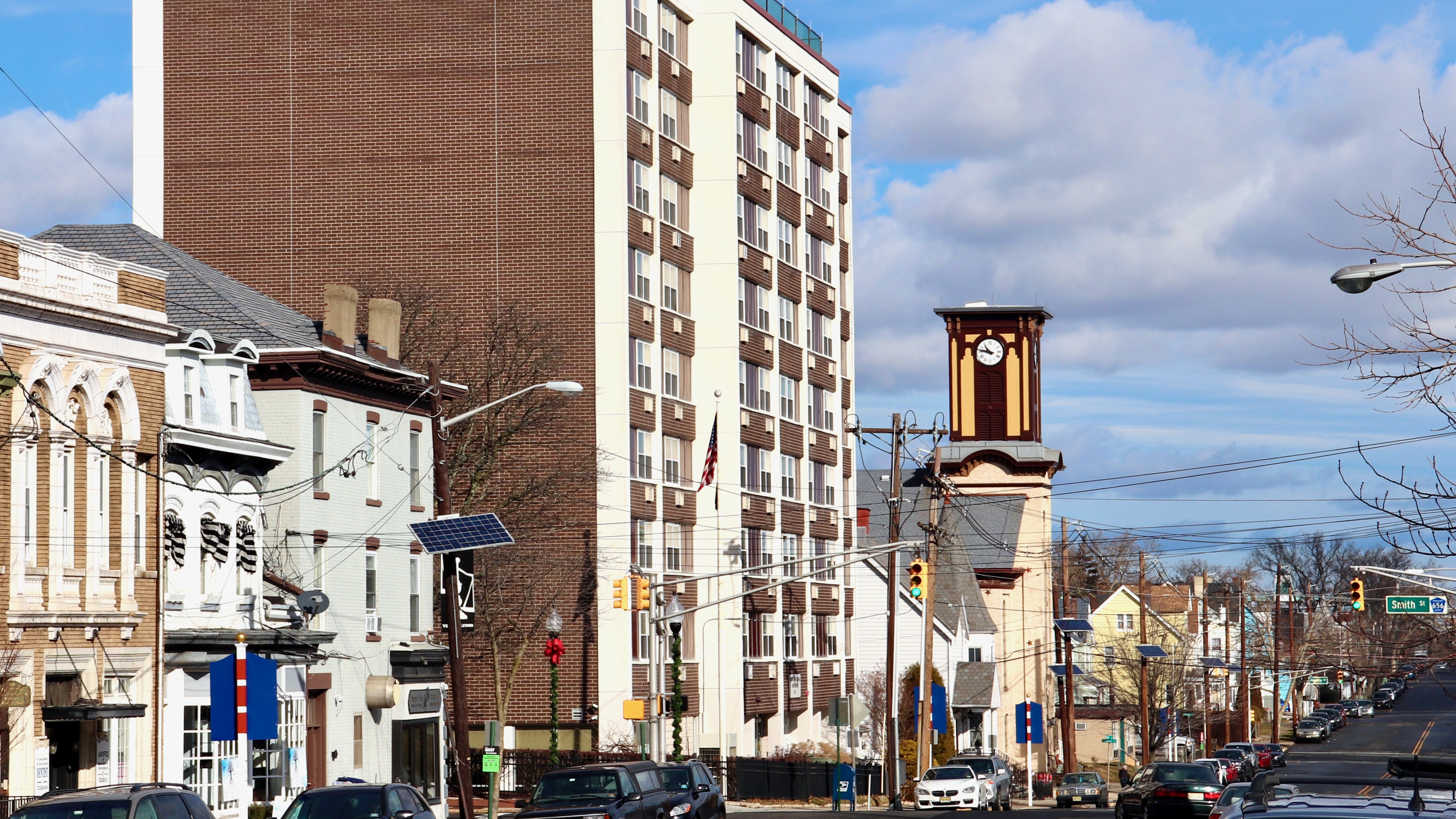
View along High Street, note the town clock

== See also ==
- National Register of Historic Places listings in Middlesex County, New Jersey
