= Thomas I. Agnew House =

Historic house in New Jersey, United States

- U.S. National Register of Historic Places
- New Jersey Register of Historic Places
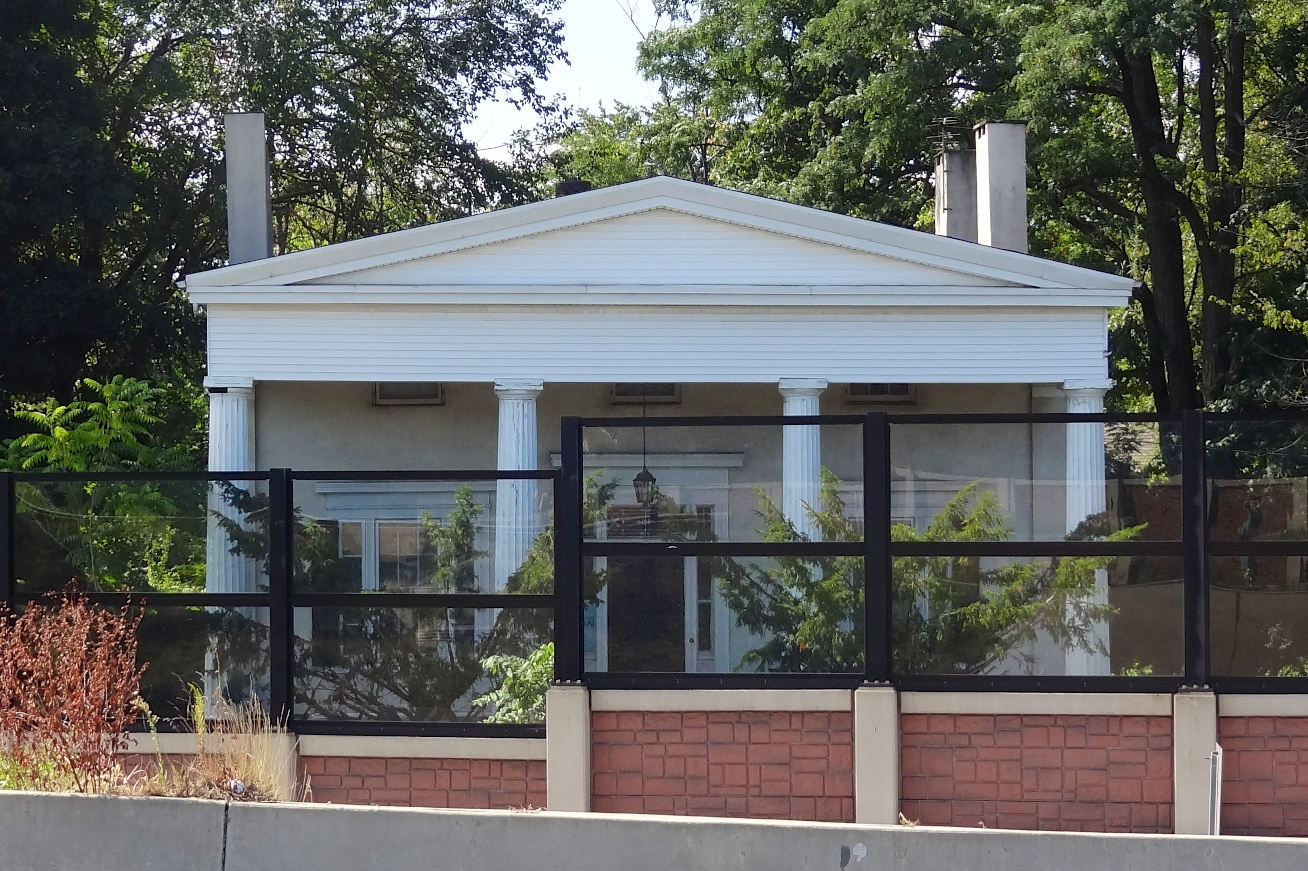

- Location within Middlesex County, New Jersey Location within New Jersey Location within the United States
- Location: 2 Crest Road, New Brunswick, New Jersey
- Coordinates: 40°29′03″N 74°25′13″W
- Area: 1 acre (0.40 ha)
- Built: 1844
- Architectural style: Greek Revival
- NRHP reference No.: 82003281
- NJRHP No.: 1847

Significant dates
- Added to NRHP: May 13, 1982
- Designated NJRHP: August 13, 1987

The Thomas I. Agnew House is a historic home located at 2 Crest Road in the city of New Brunswick in Middlesex County, New Jersey, United States. The house was added to the National Register of Historic Places on May 13, 1982, for its significance in architecture. Also known as the Agnew Mansion, it is one of two surviving Greek Revival style houses in the city.

== History and description ==
Thomas I. Agnew, a local farmer, bought a 2-acre (0.81 ha) lot here in 1835 and mortgaged the house in 1844. He left for the 1849 California gold rush and died there in 1851. His son Andrew Agnew inherited the property. The house is an example of the Greek Revival temple form and features a full portico with pediment and four Doric columns.

== See also ==
- National Register of Historic Places listings in Middlesex County, New Jersey
