= United States Post Office (Metuchen, New Jersey) =

- Metuchen Post Office
- U.S. National Register of Historic Places
- New Jersey Register of Historic Places
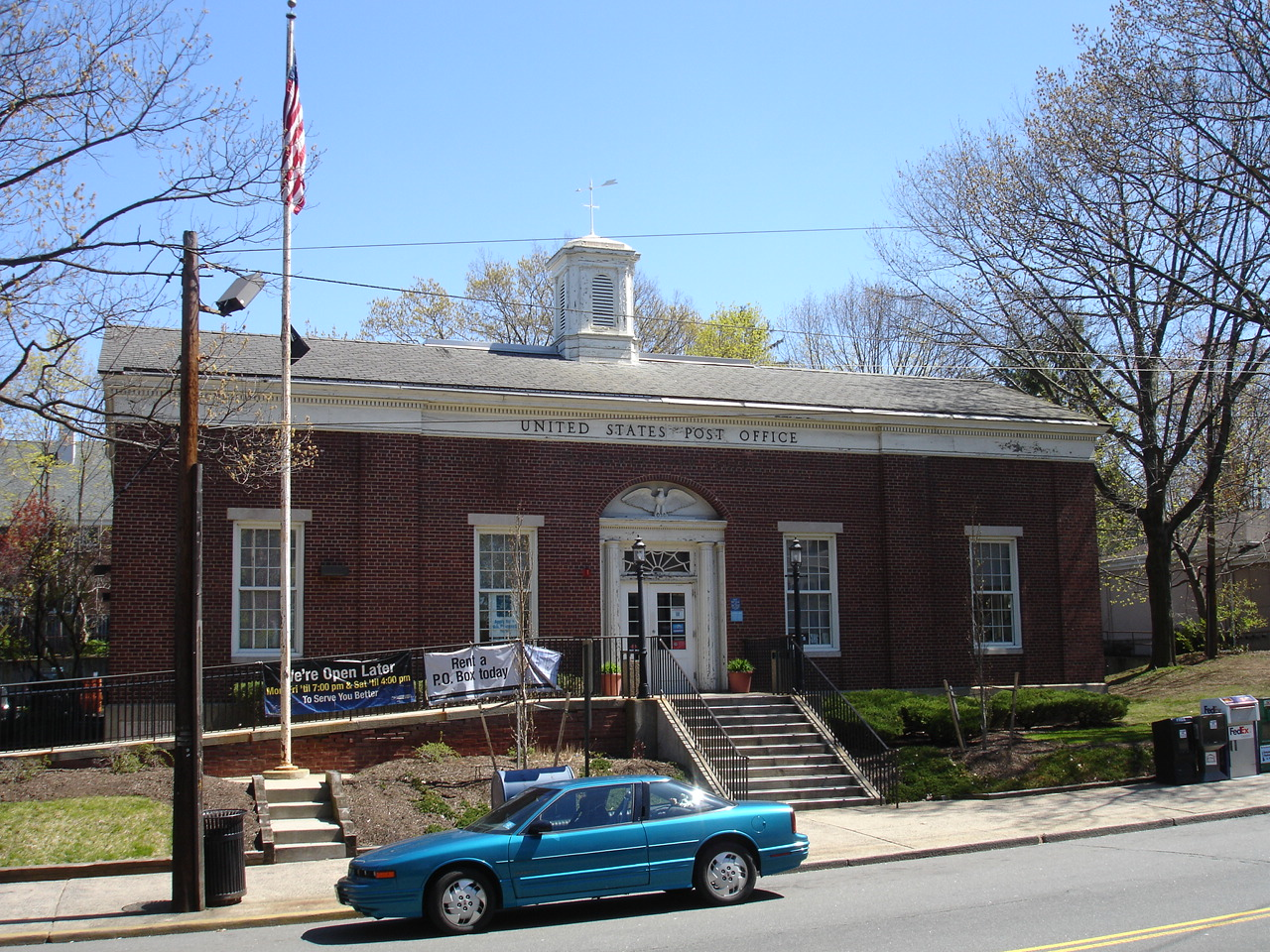

- Location within Middlesex County, New Jersey Location within New Jersey Location within the United States
- Location: 360 Main Street; Metuchen Borough, New Jersey
- Coordinates: 40°32′30″N 74°21′37″W
- Built: 1940
- Architect: Louis Adolphe Simon; Neal A. Melick
- Architectural style: Colonial Revival
- NRHP reference No.: 08000270
- NJRHP No.: 4717

Significant dates
- Added to NRHP: April 2, 2008
- Designated NJRHP: June 25, 2007

The Metuchen Post Office is a historic United States Post Office located at 360 Main Street in the Borough of Metuchen in Middlesex County, New Jersey. Listed as United States Post Office, it was added to the National Register of Historic Places on April 2, 2008, for its significance in architecture, art, communications, and politics/government.

== History and description ==
Louis A. Simon, the Supervising Architect in the Office of the Supervising Architect for the U.S. Treasury, designed the building using Colonial Revival style. Construction began in 1939, with Neal A. Melick as Supervising Engineer. The one-story brick building was dedicated on February 10, 1940. The roof has a square cupola with a weathervane. The presence of a cupola helped indicate that this was a public building. The building remains essentially unchanged since it was built.

== See also ==
- National Register of Historic Places listings in Middlesex County, New Jersey
- List of United States post offices
