= Red Maple Farm =

Historic house in New Jersey, United States

- Red Maple Farm; Gulick House
- U.S. National Register of Historic Places
- New Jersey Register of Historic Places
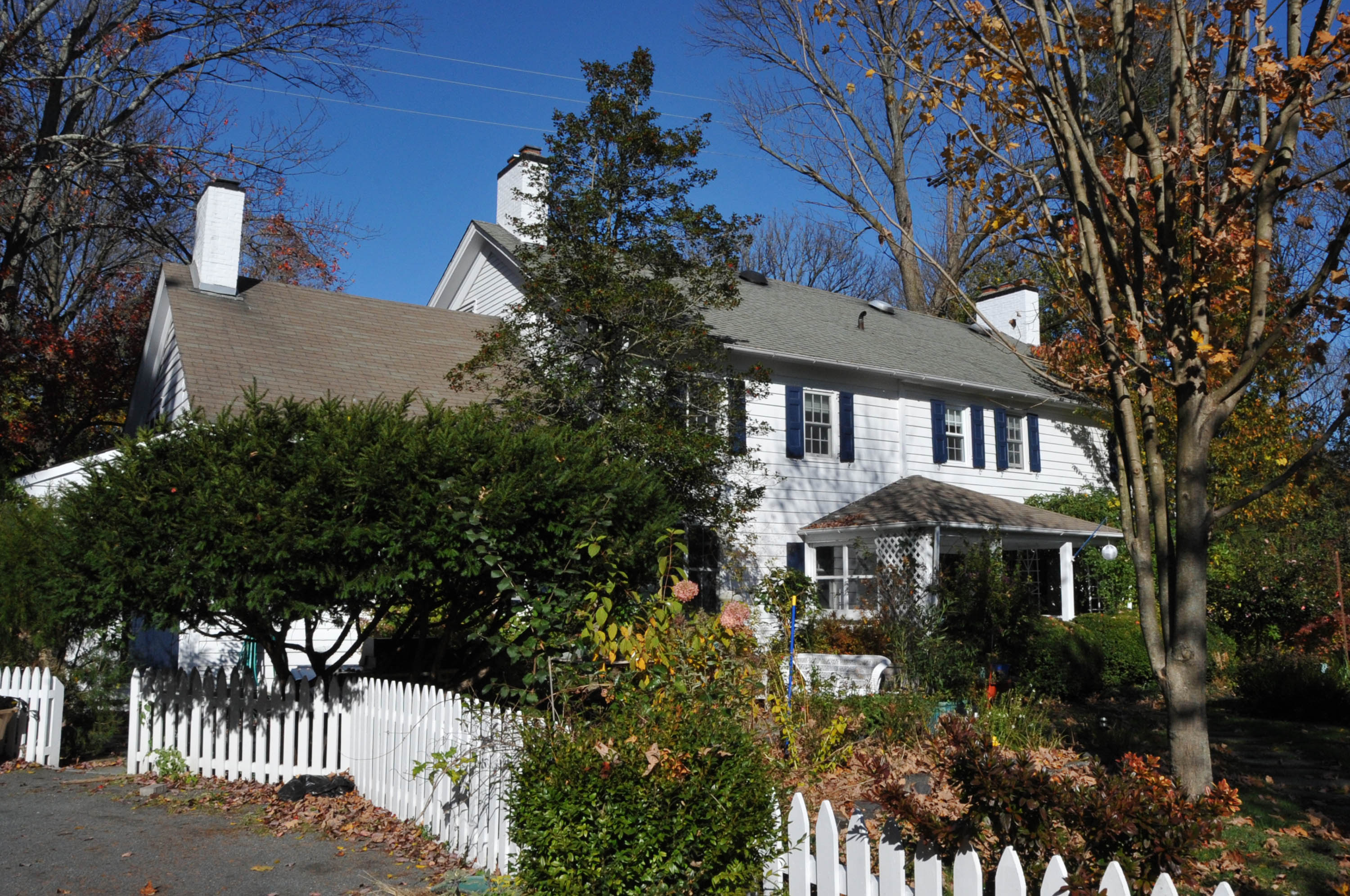

- Location within Middlesex County, New Jersey Location within New Jersey Location within the United States
- Location: 263-329 Raymond Road; Monmouth Junction, South Brunswick, New Jersey
- Coordinates: 40°22′49″N 74°35′24.7″W
- Area: 2.2 acres (0.89 ha)
- Built: 1740
- NRHP reference No.: 79001509
- NJRHP No.: 1844

Significant dates
- Added to NRHP: July 3, 1979
- Designated NJRHP: March 23, 1979

Red Maple Farm, also known as Gulick House, is a historic house and bed and breakfast located on Raymond Road west of the Monmouth Junction section of South Brunswick in Middlesex County, New Jersey. It was added to the National Register of Historic Places on July 3, 1979, for its significance in agriculture and architecture. In addition to the main house, a smoke house and barn contribute to the property.

== History and description ==
The house was built in 1740 by Joachim Gulick whose family ran a stage line. It is situated on what was the King's Highway, nearby Kingston between Princeton and New Brunswick. The house was a stop on the Underground Railroad. It remained in the Gulick family until 1901. After that the property had several owners and was subsequently subdivided.

== See also ==
- List of Underground Railroad sites
- List of the oldest buildings in New Jersey
- National Register of Historic Places listings in Middlesex County, New Jersey
