= Laing House of Plainfield Plantation =

Historic house in New Jersey, United States

- U.S. National Register of Historic Places
- New Jersey Register of Historic Places
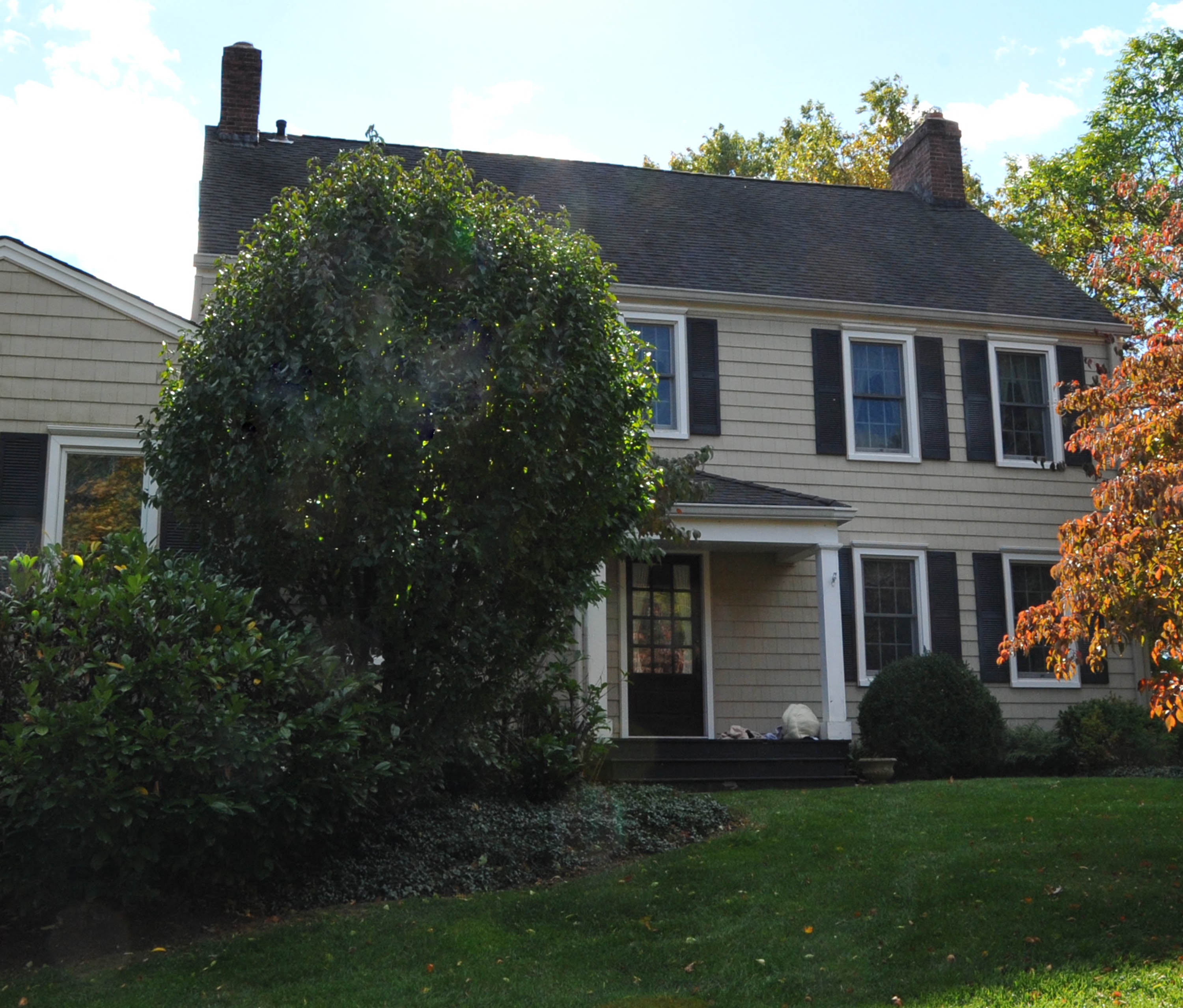
- Front of the house

- Location within Middlesex County, New Jersey Location within New Jersey Location within the United States
- Location: 1707 Woodland Avenue; Edison, New Jersey
- Coordinates: 40°34′57″N 74°23′17″W
- Built: early 1700s
- NRHP reference No.: 88002124
- NJRHP No.: 1837

Significant dates
- Added to NRHP: October 27, 1988
- Designated NJRHP: March 23, 1988

Laing House of Plainfield Plantation is a historic house located at 1707 Woodland Avenue in the township of Edison in Middlesex County, New Jersey, United States. It was built in the early 18th century when the region was being settled by Scottish Quakers in the late 17th and early 18th century, as recalled in the name of The Plainfields and Scotch Plains. The region was part of the colonial era Elizabethtown Tract and later part of Piscataway Township. It is not certain whether the name derives from the plain clothing worn by the founders or is a reference to the landscape. The house was added to the National Register of Historic Places on October 27, 1988, for its significance in exploration and settlement.

== See also ==
- List of the oldest buildings in New Jersey
- National Register of Historic Places listings in Middlesex County, New Jersey
