= Oak Ridge Park =

County park in Clark, New Jersey

Coordinates: 40°36′28″N 74°20′56″W

Oak Ridge Park is a 90-acre (36 ha) county park in Clark, New Jersey, United States, located on the border of Edison, New Jersey managed by Union County. The park, formerly Oak Ridge Golf Course, was converted to a park in 2009.

The park is home to the historic Homestead Farm at Oak Ridge.

== History ==
The farm was a 208-acre tract with colonial boundaries that functioned as a large plantation-type farmstead until 1929. Later, a portion was converted into the Oak Ridge Golf Club in the 1930s.

According to one researcher, the park may contain New Jersey's only known slave dwelling ruins.

== Park development ==
In 2009, the park was converted from the 80-year-old 18-hole Oak Ridge Golf Course. The conversion was met with opposition from local golfers.

The park features an archery range, the first public range in the county and the only one in Central Jersey.

Development of the park was expected to cost $10 – $20 million in 2014.

== See also ==
- Rahway River Parkway
