= Fieldville, New Jersey =

Populated place in Middlesex County, New Jersey, US

- Unincorporated community
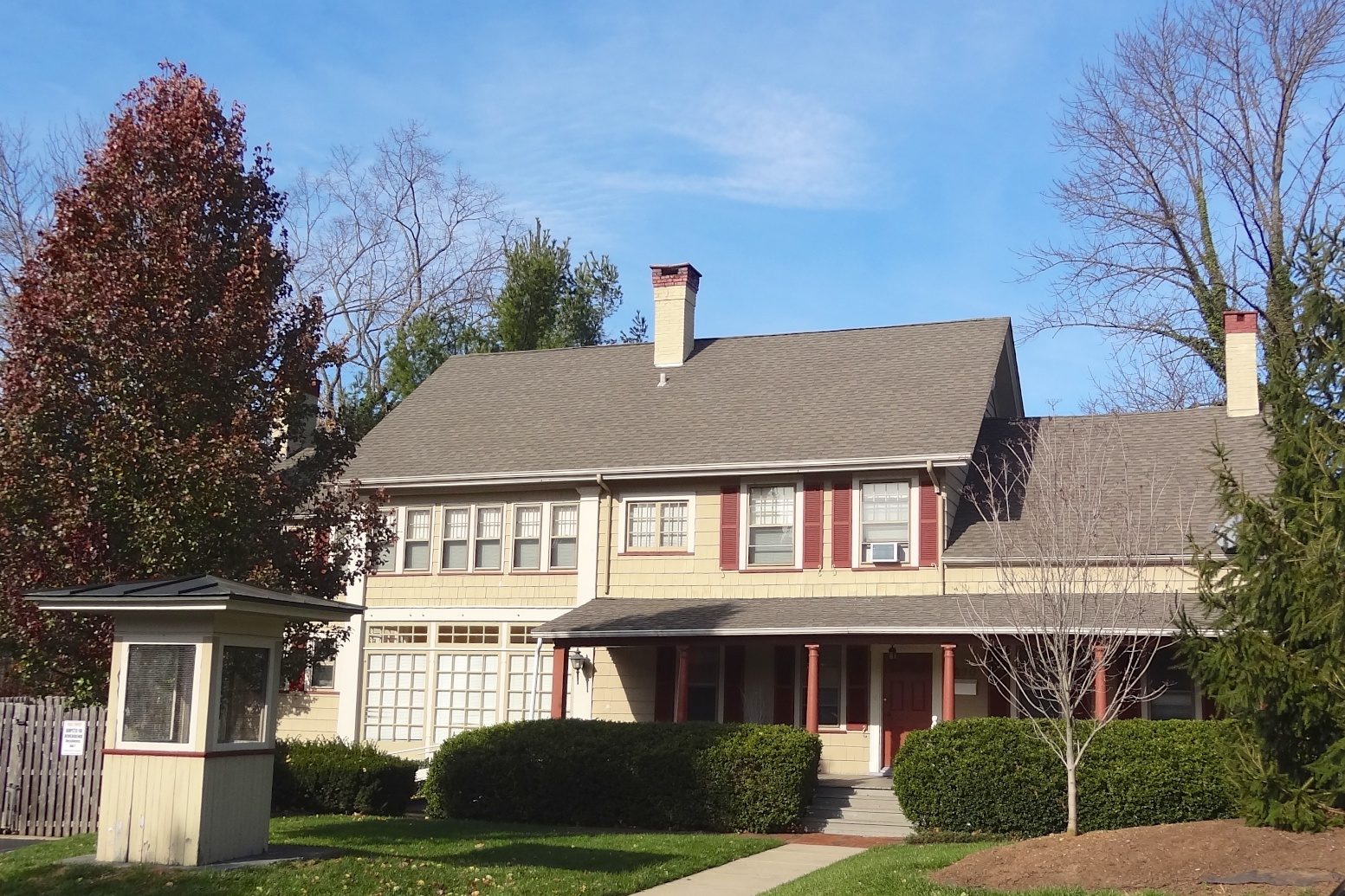
- Richard R. Field house built c. 1724

- Location within Middlesex County, New Jersey Location within New Jersey Location within the United States
- Coordinates: 40°32′50″N 74°30′24″W
- Country: United States
- State: New Jersey
- County: Middlesex
- Township: Piscataway
- Named for: John Field
- Elevation: 69 ft (21 m)
- GNIS feature ID: 883087

Fieldville is a historical unincorporated community located within Piscataway Township in Middlesex County, in the U.S. state of New Jersey. The location is sometimes described as being on River Road south of Bound Brook. The community was named after John Field and his descendants who settled the area.

== History ==
John Field (1659–1729) purchased 1,055 acres (427 ha) along the Raritan River in 1695 from Benjamin Clarke.

== Historic houses ==
The original Field House, built by John Field in 1710, was located between River Road and the Raritan River. It was destroyed in 1907.

Richard R. Field (1755–1840) lived in a frame house at 260 River Road, dated c. 1724 by a foundation stone.

John Field's grandson, John Field (born 1714), built a stone house at 625 River Road in 1743. It is a contributing property of the Road Up Raritan Historic District, listed on the National Register of Historic Places. A later addition was wood-frame construction.

About 1868, Benjamin McDowell Field built a large two-story frame house along River Road. It was also known as the Kenneth Perry House, named after its last owner. The house was destroyed by fire in 1965.

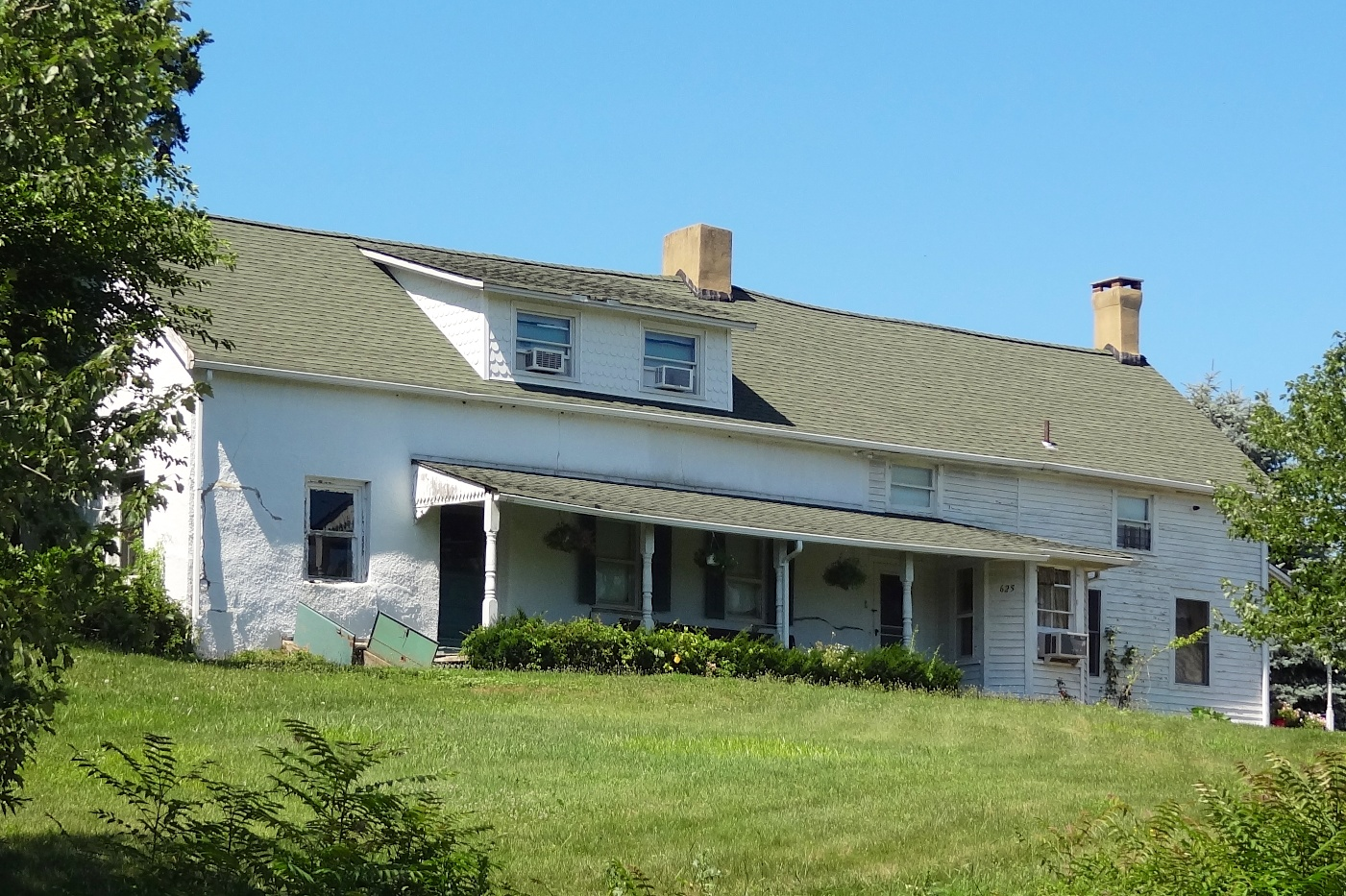
John Field House, built 1743

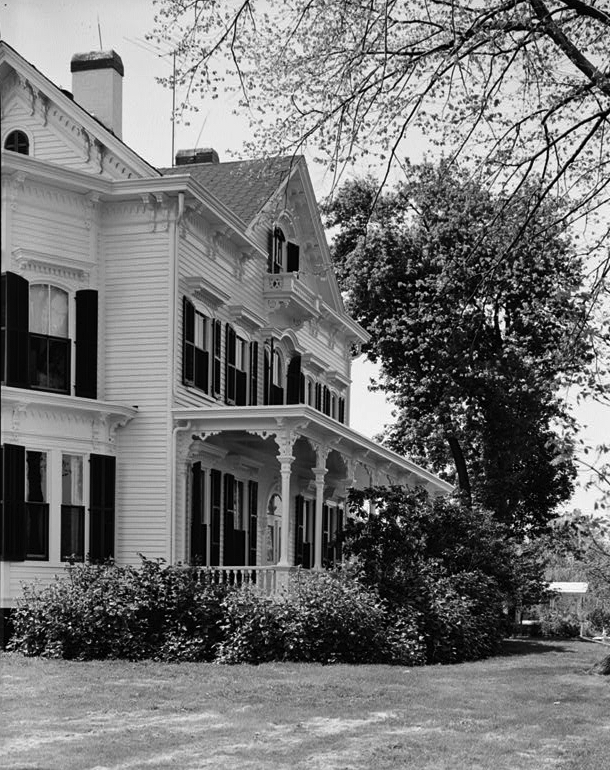
Benjamin McDowell Field House in 1960

== Fieldville Dam ==
As part of the Delaware and Raritan Canal, a dam was constructed on the Raritan River at Fieldville to supply water for the last five miles of the canal to New Brunswick. What remains of the dam can still be seen in the Raritan River, about 500 feet upstream from the I-287 North overpass near exit 10.

== Transportation ==
Fieldville is accessed by two major roads: Interstate 287 and County Route 622 (River Road).

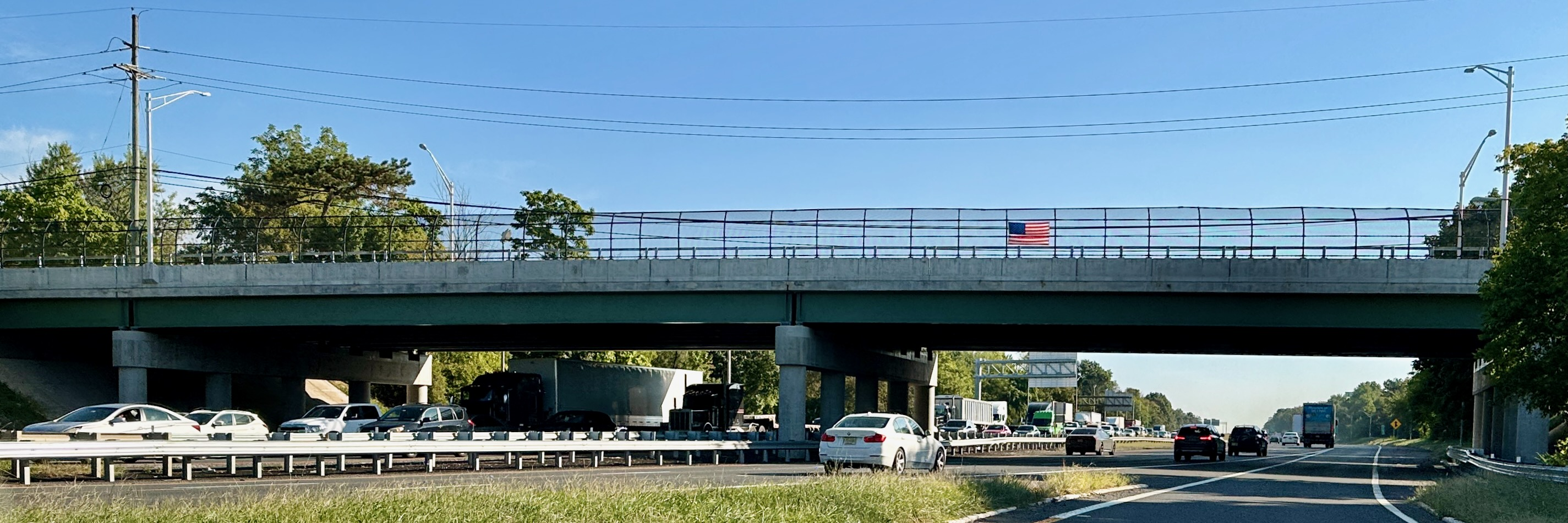
Reconstructed River Road (CR 622) Bridge over Interstate 287, exit 9, completed in 2024

== See also ==
- Road Up Raritan Historic District

== Bibliography ==
- Gabrielan, Randall (2001). Images of America: Piscataway Township. ISBN 0-7385-0439-4.
- Meuly, Walter C. (1976). History of Piscataway Township 1666–1976. Piscataway Bicentennial Commission.
- Pierce, Frederick Clifton (1901a). Field Genealogy: Being the Record of All the Field Family in America, Whose Ancestors Were in this Country Prior to 1700. Vol. 1. Virginia: W.B. Conkey Company.
- Pierce, Frederick Clifton (1901b). Field Genealogy: Being the Record of All the Field Family in America, Whose Ancestors Were in this Country Prior to 1700. Vol. 2. Virginia: W.B. Conkey Company.
