= History of slavery in New Jersey =

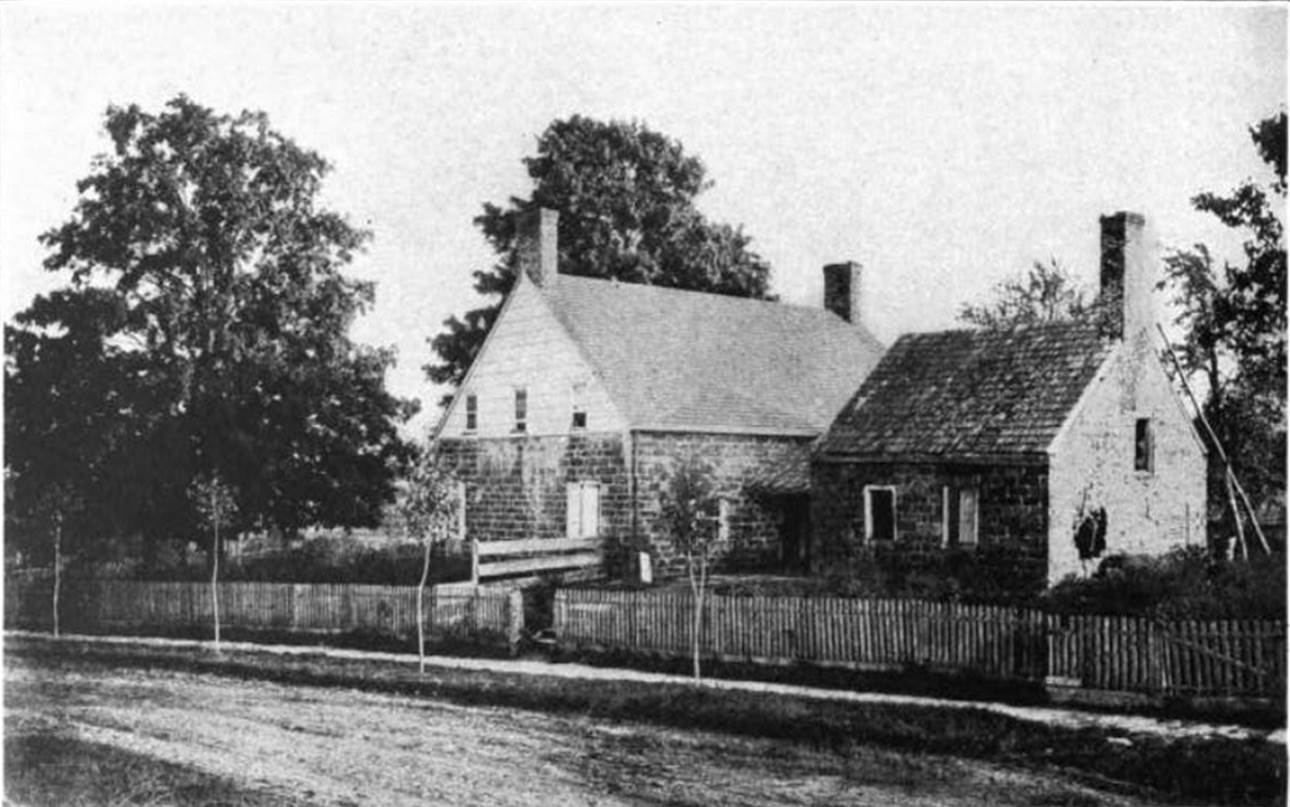
1763 home of Thomas Cadmus in Essex County, New Jersey; the loft of the smaller building was used as slave quarters.

Slavery in New Jersey began in the early 17th century, when the Dutch trafficked African slaves for labor to develop the colony of New Netherland. After the English took control of the colony in 1664, they continued the importation of slaves from Africa. They also imported "seasoned" slaves from their colonies in the West Indies and enslaved Native Americans from the Carolinas.

Most Dutch and English settlers entered the colony as indentured servants, who worked for a fixed number of years to repay their passage. As conditions in England improved and the number of indentured laborers declined, slave-trading companies imported more Africans for needed labor. To promote increasing the number of laborers and settlers in order to develop the colony, the colonial government awarded settlers headrights of 60 acres (24 ha) of land for each person transported to the colony. In 1704, after East Jersey and West Jersey were unified, the royal colony of the province passed a slave code prohibiting slaves and free Blacks from owning property, further restricting Africans and African-Americans.

During the American Revolution, enslaved people fought on both sides. The Patriots banned the importation of new slaves, as they were largely transported to the region on British slave ships, and the New Jersey Legislature later freed any slave imported after 1776. The British promised freedom to slaves who would leave Patriot masters and fight for them. The number of Blacks in Manhattan increased to 10,000, as thousands of enslaved Africans escaped to the British for the promise of freedom.

Bergen County, which until 1840 included all of Hudson County, developed as the largest slaveholding county in the state, in part because many enslaved Africans were used as laborers in its ports and cities. At its peak Bergen County enslaved 3,000 Africans in 1800, constituting nearly 20% of its total population. After the Revolutionary War, many northern states rapidly passed laws to abolish slavery, but New Jersey did not abolish it until 1804, and then in a process of gradual emancipation similar to that of New York. However, in New Jersey, some Blacks were still held in bondage as late as 1865. (In New York, they were all freed by 1827.) The law declared that children born to enslaved mothers after July 4, 1804, would be free at birth, but it required those children to serve lengthy apprenticeships as a type of indentured servant until early adulthood for the masters of their mothers kept in bondage. The law made no provision for the emancipation of enslaved people born before this date. New Jersey was the last of the Northern states to abolish slavery completely. The 1860 census listed at least 43 people in New Jersey as slaves, the youngest being 11 and oldest being 95. Thirty-eight of these people were enslaved for life. This calculation is almost certainly an underestimate, given that slaves were not meant to be recorded on regular census schedules. Dedicated slave schedules, as recorded throughout the South in the 1850 and 1860 censuses, were indeed not used in New Jersey. The 16 enslaved people who remained in New Jersey in December 1865 were freed by the Thirteenth Amendment.

The Underground Railroad had several routes crossing the state, four of which ended in Jersey City, where fugitive slaves could cross the Hudson River. New Brunswick, 'Hub City', was a main location where runaways would travel during the days of the Underground Railroad. During the American Civil War, African Americans served in several all-black Union Army regiments from New Jersey.

In 2008, the legislature of New Jersey passed a resolution of official apology for slavery, becoming the third state to do so. Rutgers, the State University moved to rectify its past wrongs and connections to slavery during its 250th anniversary celebration in 2016. Princeton University, the oldest college in the state of New Jersey, released the findings of its Princeton & Slavery Project in 2017.

In 2019, the Durand-Hedden House & Garden in Maplewood, New Jersey, created an extensive exhibit on the history of slavery in New Jersey.

== Colonial period ==
Before the Dutch West India Company, formed in 1621, become a permanent fixture in North America, its "colonies" were more outposts used for seasonal trading, only intermittently occupied. Constructed c. 1623/24, its first fort, Fort Nassau, in South Jersey on the banks of the Delaware at the intersection of modern Gloucester and Camden Counties, is considered by historians to have been constructed (at least in part) by slave labor.

The Dutch West India Company introduced slavery in 1625 with the trafficking of eleven African slaves to New Amsterdam, capital of the nascent province of New Netherland. They worked as farmers, fur traders, and builders. It later expanded across the North River (Hudson River) to Pavonia and Communipaw, eventually becoming Bergen, where these men worked the company plantation. Settlers to the area later enslaved men privately, often using them as domestic servants and laborers. Although enslaved, the Africans had a few basic rights and families were usually kept intact. They were admitted to the Dutch Reformed Church and married by its ministers, who also baptized their children. While enslaved Africans could be admitted to the Church, the church itself did not prohibit their enslavement, which it not find sinful. The enslaved could testify in court, sign legal documents, and bring civil actions against whites. Some were permitted to work after hours, when they earned wages equal to those paid to white workers. When the colony fell, the company relinquished enslavement, establishing early on a nucleus of free negros.

Ensuring that enslaved Africans could work the settlers' land for free became an incentive to attract permanent New Netherland settlement under the Dutch patroon system. One example of this is in 1630, when director Michael Pauw decreed the West India Company to source 50 enslaved Africans from Pernambuco (a major slave hub in Brazil, freshly taken over by the Dutch just months prior) to Pavonia. Patroons were then promised a supply of Africans from the WIC for lease or for permanent assignment to their land.

English traders continued to traffic African slaves after they took over the colony from the Dutch in 1664 and established a proprietorship. Eager to attract more settlers and laborers to develop the colony, the proprietorship encouraged the trafficking of slaves for labor by offering settlers headrights, an award of allocations of land based on the number of workers, slaves or indentured servants, trafficked to the colony. The first African slaves to appear in English records were owned by Colonel Lewis Morris in Shrewsbury. In an early attempt to encourage European settlement, the New Jersey legislature enacted a prohibitive tariff against trafficked slaves to encourage European indentured servitude. When this act expired in 1721, however, Governor William Burnet countered attempts to renew it, since the slave trade had become a lucrative enterprise.

The liberties of the enslaved peoples of New Jersey were formally curtailed under a law passed in 1704, a so-called 'slave code'. This code prohibited the owning of property by slaves and by free African Americans as well. In addition, it made certain actions illegal for African Americans, like staying out past curfew, that were not illegal for European Americans.

According to one researcher, Oak Ridge Park in Union County may contain New Jersey's only known ruins of slave dwellings.

Camden was a center for the importation of slaves, its ferry docks on the Delaware River across from Philadelphia acting as auction sites for the plantations in the Delaware Valley, of which Pomona Hall was one.

As a free port, Perth Amboy was a harbor friendly to slaving vessels. "Barracks of considerable size once stood in Perth Amboy, near the junction of Smith and Water streets, in which the slaves were [kept confined] as imported."

In 2016 Rutgers University published a report Scarlet and Black recording the university's relationship with slavery. In 2017 Princeton University made public the findings of the Princeton & Slavery Project, which is ongoing.

== Post-American Revolution ==
African-American slaves fought on both sides in the War for Independence. The British Crown promised slaves freedom for leaving their rebel masters to join their cause. The number of Blacks in New York rose to 10,000 as slaves escaped there from both northern and southern masters after the British occupied the city. The British kept their promise and evacuated thousands of freedmen from New York, resettling 3,500 Black Loyalists in its colony of Nova Scotia and others in the Caribbean islands. Colonel Tye, also known as Titus Cornelius (c. 1753–1780), was a slave of African descent who achieved notability during the war by his leadership and fighting skills, and was one of the most effective guerrilla leaders opposing the American rebel forces in Central Jersey.

Following the Revolutionary War in the 1780s, New Jersey initially resisted the urge to free slaves due to a desire to re-build their devastated economy. According to the American historian Giles Wright, by 1790 New Jersey's enslaved population numbered approximately 14,000. They were virtually all of African descent. The 1790 federal census, however, recorded 11,423 slaves, 6.2 percent of the total population of 184,139. In the decades before the Revolution, slaves were numerous near Perth Amboy, the primary point of entry for New Jersey, and in the eastern counties. Slaves were generally used for agricultural labor, but they also filled skilled artisan jobs in shipyards and industry in coastal cities.

== Abolition of slavery ==
Following the Revolutionary War, New Jersey banned the importation of slaves in 1788, but at the same time forbade free Blacks from elsewhere from settling in the state. The New Jersey state legislature also freed any slave brought into the state after 1776, required consent of the enslaved to be sold out of state, and allowed manumission by slave owner consent at birth, but also increased efforts to control free people of color. Led by western New Jersey Quakers, the New Jersey Society for the Abolition of Slavery was founded in 1786, and abolitionist sentiment, such as through acts of manumission and the importation ban did significantly decrease the population in slavery, although in-state, public slave sales continued to 1804, and slave-owning remained a powerful, if sometimes contested, political interest. In the first two decades after the war many northern states made moves towards abolishing slavery, and some slaveholders independently manumitted their slaves. Since slave labor were widely used in the state ports, as well as in agriculture for shipment, the state's legislature was the last in the North to abolish slavery, passing a law in 1804 for its gradual emancipation. The 1804 statute and subsequent laws freed children born after the law was passed. African Americans born to slave mothers after July 4, 1804, had to serve lengthy apprenticeships to the owners of their mothers. Women were freed at 21, but men were not emancipated until the age of 25. Slaves who had been born before these laws were passed were considered, after 1846, as indentured servants who were "apprenticed for life".

Although at first New Jersey allowed free people of color to vote, the legislature disfranchised them in 1807, an exclusion that lasted until 1875. By 1830 two-thirds of the slaves remaining in the North were held by masters in New Jersey, as New York had freed the last of its slaves in 1827 under gradual abolition. It was not until 1846 that New Jersey abolished slavery, but it qualified it by redefining former slaves as apprentices who were "apprenticed for life" to their masters. Slavery did not truly end in the state until it was ended nationally in 1865 after the American Civil War and passage of the Thirteenth Amendment to the U.S. Constitution.

According to historian James Gigantino (University of Arkansas), during the early nineteenth century in New Jersey, there were more female than male slaves. After the passage of the Act of Gradual Abolition in New Jersey in 1804, a greater number of advertisements in the state for the full-title sale of female slaves of child-bearing age were published. Female slaves were highly valuable due to their reproductive capabilities because their children would be born as slaves for a term, even after the 1804 Act of Gradual Abolition. However, domestic skills and labor also affected the value and marketability of female slaves. By 1830, African Americans made up 6% of the total population of New Jersey. The city of New Brunswick had a large African American population at around 11%. This was one of the reasons why New Brunswick became a favorable location for runaways, but it also made the city into a popular site for slave hunters, who wished to enforce the federal fugitive slave laws of 1850. In more urban areas of the state, like New Brunswick, there were frequent advertisements for the sale of female slaves, both before and after passage of the 1804 Act of Gradual Abolition. This was because female slaves were more highly favored for domestic work, which was in greater demand in urban spaces like New Brunswick. Enslaved women, however, also performed manual labor across the state of New Jersey.

Yet the Gradual Abolition Act of 1804 did not guarantee that a slave born after 1804 would gain their freedom. Slaveholders would regularly sell those slaves down south to states like Louisiana before the slaves reached manumission age. By the 1830s, slavery was on the decline in New Jersey.

Communities of free negros and freedmen formed at Dunkerhook in Paramus and at the New York state line at Skunk Hollow, also called The Mountain. A founding African-American settler bought land there in 1806, and later bought more. Other families joined him, and the community continued into the twentieth century. According to the historian David S. Cohen in The Ramapo Mountain People (1974), free people of color migrated from Manhattan into other parts of the frontier of northeastern New Jersey, where some intermarried and became ancestors of the Ramapo Mountain Indians. (Cohen's findings have been disputed by some scholars, including Albert J. Catalano.)

According to Gigantino, one in ten slaves in New Jersey remained enslaved for life. Many slaveholders in New Jersey sold their slaves to Southerners and displayed antipathy toward abolition. He stated that about one quarter of New Jersey's African American population was forced into labor during the 1830s. Improper information regarding who was free led to it appearing as though slavery decreased more rapidly than it actually did.

Slavery remains legal via the Exception Punishment Clause of the 13th amendment in New Jersey.

== Civil War ==
A total of 2,909 United States Colored Troops from New Jersey served in the Union Army. Because of the state's long-term apprenticeship requirements, at the close of the American Civil War, some African Americans in New Jersey remained in bondage. It was not until the Thirteenth Amendment to the United States Constitution was passed in 1865 that the last 16 slaves in the state were freed.

In the 1860 census, free colored persons in New Jersey numbered 25,318, about 4% of the state's population of 672,035. By 1870 the number had increased to 30,658, but they constituted a smaller percentage of the total population because of the high rate of European immigration. Overall, New Jersey's population had increased to 906,096, with nearly 200,000 European immigrants.

New Jersey was slow to abolish slavery and reluctant to pass the 13th Amendment, which it did in January 1866. Some of its industries, such as shoes and clothing, had strong markets in the South supplying planters for their slaves, which was probably a factor.

On March 31, 1870, Thomas Mundy Peterson became the first African American to vote in a New Jersey election in 63 years, since the state restricted voting to whites in 1807. By then, hundreds of thousands of African Americans had already voted in southern states under Reconstruction-era state constitutions.

In 1875, "Jack" Jackson, described in a newspaper as "the last slave in New Jersey", died at the age of 87 on the Smith family farm at Secaucus. Abel Smith had manumitted his slaves in 1820, but Jackson "refused to accept his liberty" and remained on the family estate until his death.

Another claim for the last surviving slave in the state belongs to Anthony Thompson. Born in 1798 in Somerset County, Thompson and his mother were later sold to Samuel M. Ward in Essex County. He was freed in 1822 and purchased a home in West Orange in 1833. He died in 1884.

== Percent of population ==
Enslaved population in New Jersey, in comparison to total population
Year	Number of slaves	State population	Percent slaves
1727	3,981	47,402	8.4%
1745	4,606	61,383	7.5%
1790	11,423	184,139	6.2%
1800	12,422	211,949	5.8%
1810	10,851	245,555	4.4%
1820	7,557	277,575	2.7%
1830	2,254	320,823	0.7%
1840	674	373,306	0.18%
1850	236	489,555	0.048%
1860	43	672,035	0.0027%

== Apology ==
In 2008, the New Jersey Legislature acknowledged the state's role in the history of slavery in the United States.

The Legislature of the State of New Jersey expresses its profound regret for the State's role in slavery and apologizes for the wrongs inflicted by slavery and its after effects in the United States of America; expresses its deepest sympathies and solemn regrets to those who were enslaved and the descendants of those slaves, who were deprived of life, human dignity, and the constitutional protections accorded all citizens of the United States; and we encourage all citizens to remember and teach their children about the history of slavery, Jim Crow laws, and modern day slavery, to ensure that these tragedies will neither be forgotten nor repeated.

In 2019, the Legislative Black Caucus initiated efforts to research the role slavery played in the state.

== Exhibitions ==
In 2019, the Durand-Hedden House & Garden in Maplewood, New Jersey, created an extensive exhibit on the history of slavery in New Jersey. That exhibit was then developed into the book Slavery in New Jersey: A Troubled History, authored by Gail R. Safian, who is currently president of the Durand-Hedden House & Garden Association. The book was awarded the first-place Kevin M. Hale Publications Award by the League of Historical Societies of New Jersey and was chosen by The New Jersey State Bar Foundation as the basis of its curriculum section on slavery in New Jersey, part of a larger curriculum it developed for middle and high school students on African American history.

== See also ==
- Colonel Tye
- Abolitionism in the United States
- American Civil War
- Fugitive slave laws
- Slave rebellion
- Slavery in Colonial America
- Slavery in the United States
- List of Underground Railroad sites
- Bordentown School
- History of slavery in the United States by state
