= Road Up Raritan Historic District =

Historic district in New Jersey, United States

- U.S. National Register of Historic Places
- U.S. Historic district
- New Jersey Register of Historic Places
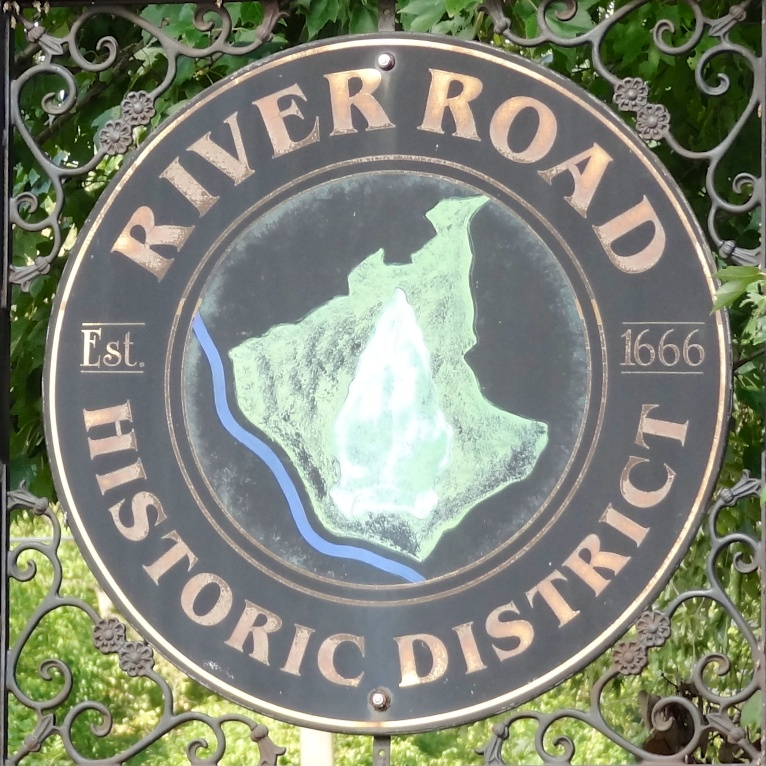

- Location within Middlesex County, New Jersey Location within New Jersey Location within the United States
- Location: Along River Road, from Ellis Parkway to 899 River Road; Piscataway, New Jersey
- Coordinates: 40°31′35″N 74°29′29″W
- Area: 69 acres (28 ha)
- Architectural style: Italianate, Greek Revival, Colonial Revival
- NRHP reference No.: 97001146
- NJRHP No.: 3320

Significant dates
- Added to NRHP: September 18, 1997
- Designated NJRHP: August 7, 1997

The Road Up Raritan Historic District is a 69-acre (28 ha) historic district located along River Road in the township of Piscataway in Middlesex County, New Jersey. It is north of Raritan Landing, once an important inland port on the Raritan River during the 18th and 19th centuries. The name is taken from an earlier colonial era name for what was once a Lenape path, Assunpink Trail that became a main road parallel to the river. Piscataway Township itself was formed on December 18, 1666 as one of the first seven townships in East Jersey, and is one of the oldest municipalities in the state. It was added to the National Register of Historic Places on September 18, 1997, for its significance in architecture, military history, and exploration/settlement. The district includes nine of fourteen historic homes along an approximately 1.2-mile (1.9 km) stretch of River Road. The Metlar-Bodine House and the Cornelius Low House are also in the immediate vicinity.

== Contributing properties ==
There are seven contributing properties in the district plus two properties that were previously listed.

Name	Image	Address	Date	Notes
John Field House		625 River Road	c. 1743	
W. Dunham House		649 River Road	c. 1760	Originally Field House
Isaac Onderdonk House		685 River Road	c. 1750	Listed on the NRHP
Lewis Onderdonk House		701 River Road	c. 1841	
John Onderdonk House		730 River Road	1854	first recorded deed
Richard Field, Jr. House		771 River Road	c. 1832	
Matthias Hendricke Smock House		851 River Road	c. 1720	Listed on the NRHP
Jonathan Smock House		871 River Road	c. 1850	
Hendrick Smock House		899 River Road	c. 1865	Also known as Smock-Voorhees House

== See also ==
- National Register of Historic Places listings in Middlesex County, New Jersey
- East Jersey Old Town Village
- Fieldville
- List of the oldest buildings in New Jersey
