= National Musical String Company =

- U.S. National Register of Historic Places
- New Jersey Register of Historic Places
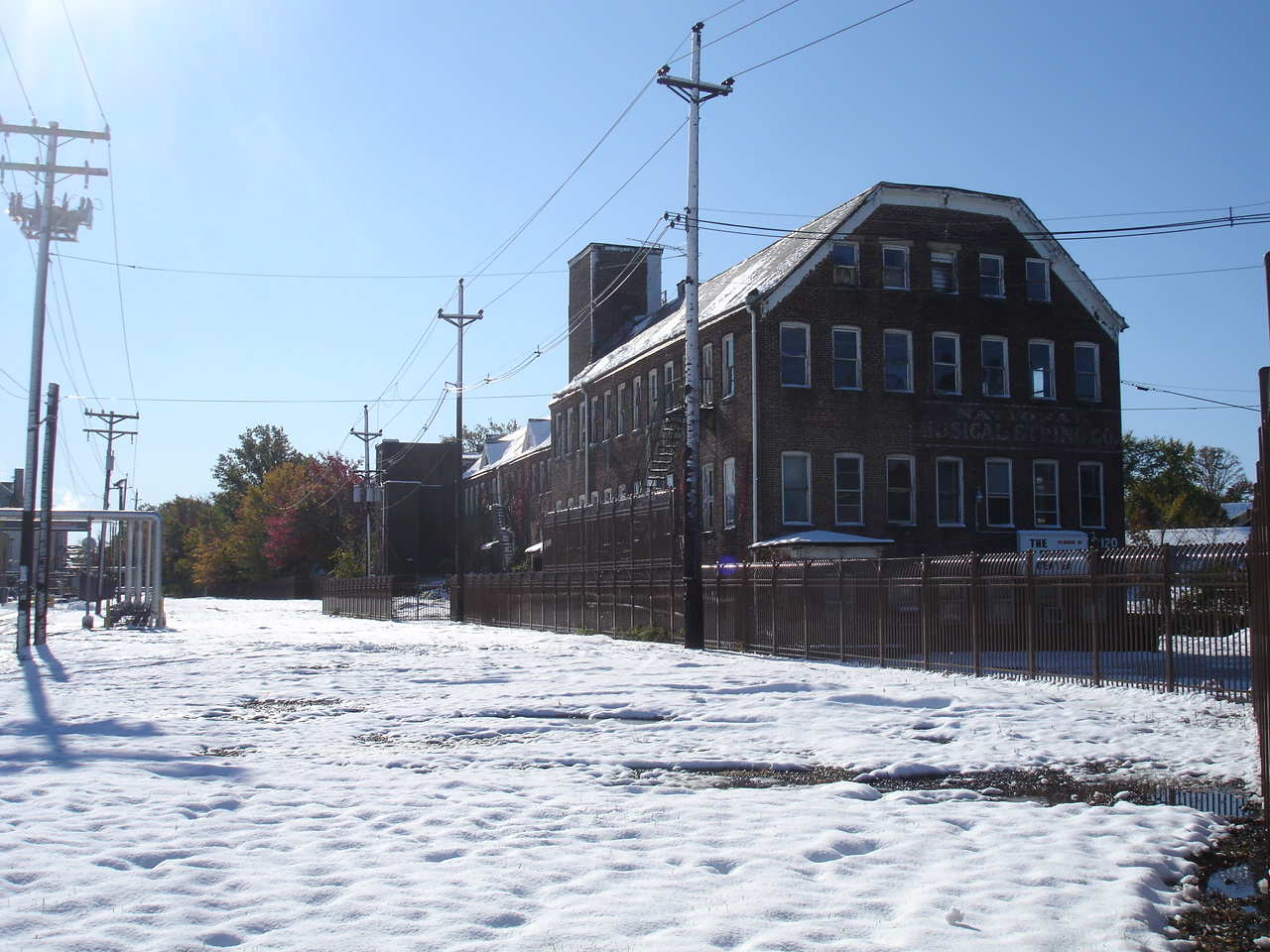
- The National Musical String Company Building in Fall 2011

- Location within Middlesex County, New Jersey Location within New Jersey Location within the United States
- Location: 120 Georges Road, New Brunswick, New Jersey
- Coordinates: 40°28′33″N 74°26′52″W
- Area: 2.5 acres (1.0 ha)
- Built: 1898
- Architect: Ben C. DeKamp
- NRHP reference No.: 82003283
- NJRHP No.: 1872

Significant dates
- Added to NRHP: April 20, 1982
- Designated NJRHP: March 27, 1981

The National Musical String Company is a defunct music string factory located at 120 Georges Road in the city of New Brunswick in Middlesex County, New Jersey, United States. It was built in 1898 and was designed by the architect Ben C. DeKamp. The building was added to the National Register of Historic Places on April 20, 1982, for its significance in architecture, industry, and music.

The company was to make the first harmonicas in America, and became the world's largest producer of steel strings. The property is being redeveloped by Pioli Properties as a mixed-use site with the primary National Music String building renovated for commercial retail uses on the first level, and 38 residential apartment units on the second and third floors.

== See also ==
- National Register of Historic Places listings in Middlesex County, New Jersey
