= Homestead Farm at Oak Ridge =

Historic house in New Jersey, United States

- U.S. National Register of Historic Places
- New Jersey Register of Historic Places
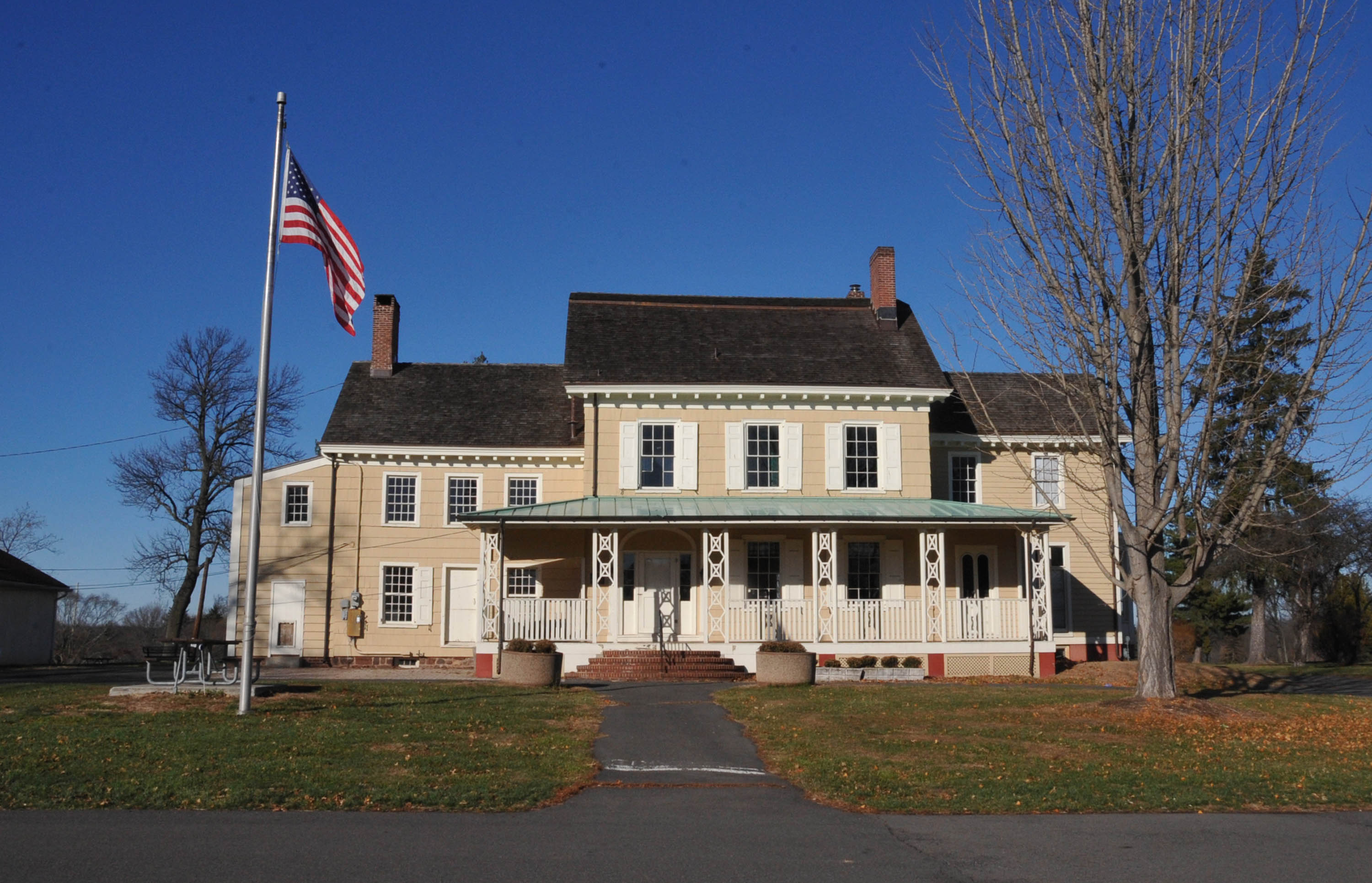

- Location within Union County, New Jersey Location within Middlesex County, New Jersey Location within New Jersey Location within the United States
- Location: Oak Ridge Road and Feather Bed Lane; Clark, New Jersey; Edison, New Jersey
- Coordinates: 40°36′19″N 74°20′45″W
- Area: 208 acres (84 ha)
- Built: c. 1720–1740
- Architectural style: Federal, Colonial, Italianate
- NRHP reference No.: 95001185
- NJRHP No.: 2800

Significant dates
- Added to NRHP: October 25, 1995
- Designated NJRHP: September 8, 1995

The Homestead Farm at Oak Ridge is a historic house and grounds located in Oak Ridge Park in the township of Clark in Union County, New Jersey and extending into the township of Edison in Middlesex County. It was listed on the National Register of Historic Places on October 25, 1995, for its significance in architecture, exploration/settlement, law, military history, and politics/government. In addition to the building, the listing includes three contributing sites and one contributing object.

== History and description ==
The oldest part of the house was built c. 1720–1740. The site was formerly known as Ash Swamp and played a pivotal role in the Battle of Short Hills during the American Revolutionary War.

The home is associated with Judge Hugh Hartshorne Bowne. The Squire Hartshorne House and the Robinson Plantation House are other homes from the 18th century located in Clark. In May 2009, the Union County Board of Chosen Freeholders announced its support of preservation of the building site.

== See also ==
- List of the oldest buildings in New Jersey
- National Register of Historic Places listings in Middlesex County, New Jersey
- National Register of Historic Places listings in Union County, New Jersey
- Nathaniel Drake House
