= King Block (New Brunswick, New Jersey) =

- U.S. National Register of Historic Places
- New Jersey Register of Historic Places
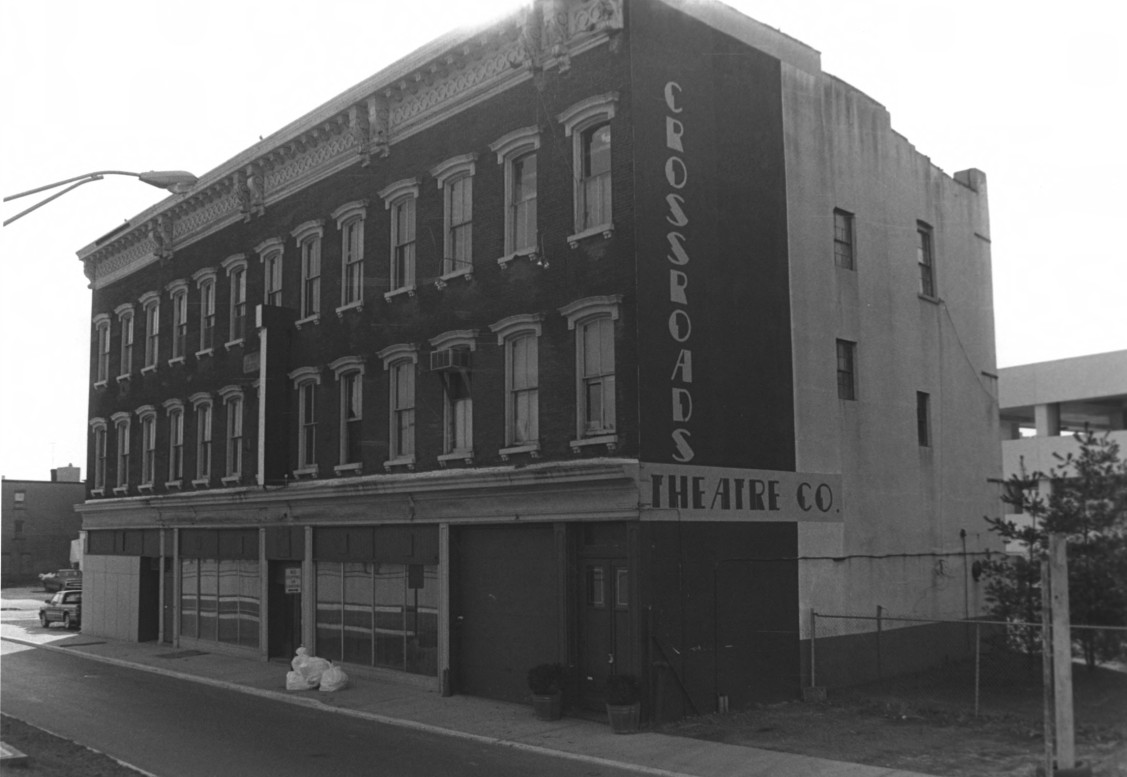
- The block in 1988

- Location within Middlesex County, New Jersey Location within New Jersey Location within the United States
- Location: 316–324 Memorial Parkway, New Brunswick, New Jersey
- Coordinates: 40°29′44″N 74°26′26″W
- Built: 1860
- Architectural style: Italianate
- NRHP reference No.: 88000644
- NJRHP No.: 1868

Significant dates
- Added to NRHP: May 26, 1988
- Designated NJRHP: December 3, 1987

The King Block, also known as the Crossroads Theater, was a historic building located on Memorial Parkway (Burnet Street) in the city of New Brunswick in Middlesex County, New Jersey, United States. It was added to the National Register of Historic Places on May 26, 1988, for its significance in commerce.

== History ==
The Crossroads Theater Company used the building until 1991, when the company moved from King Block to Monument Square. The building was demolished for redevelopment in the early 1990s.

== See also ==
- National Register of Historic Places listings in Middlesex County, New Jersey
