= Old School Baptist Church and Cemetery =

Historic site in Middlesex County, New Jersey, US

- U.S. National Register of Historic Places
- New Jersey Register of Historic Places
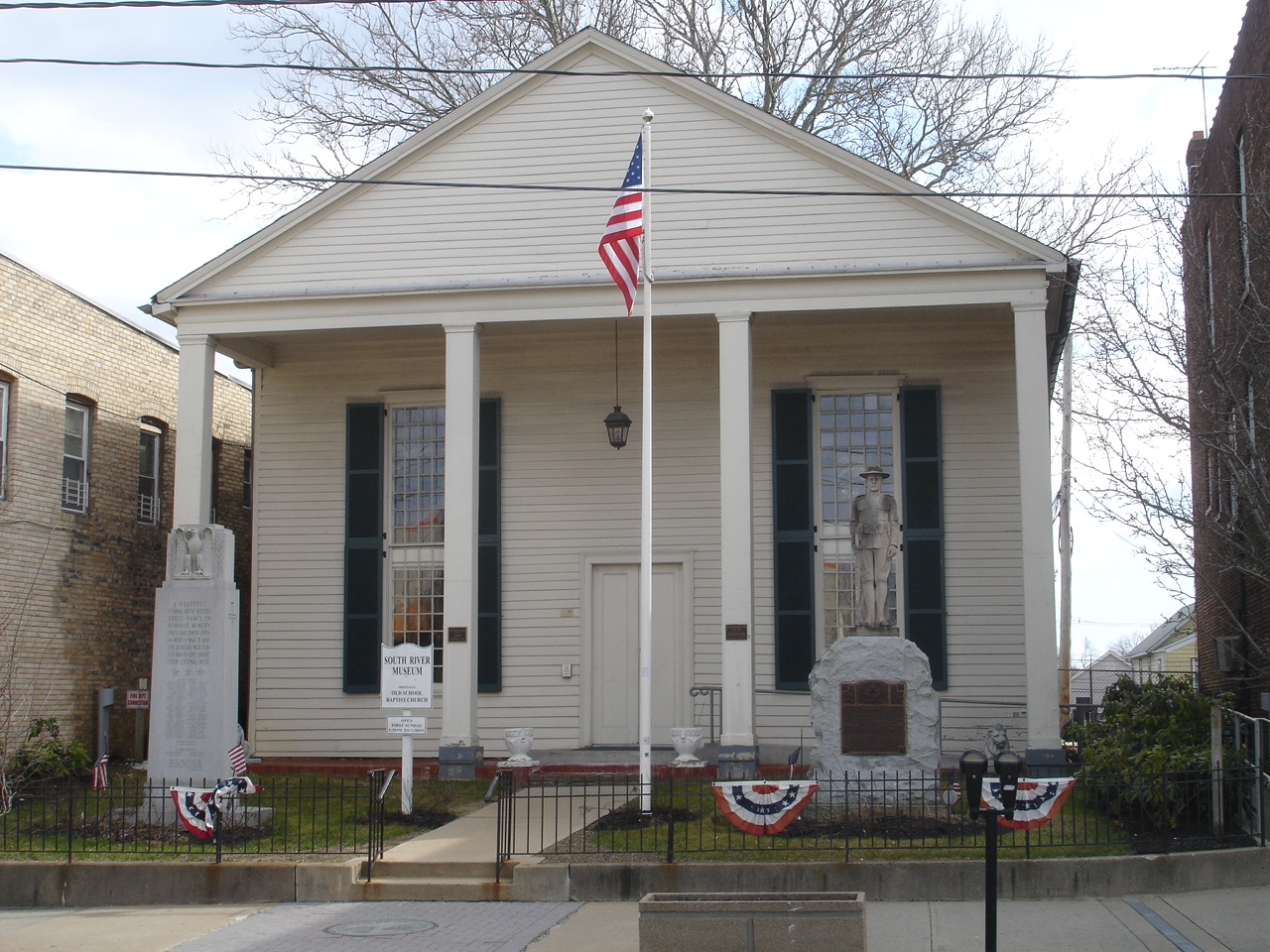
- The Old School Baptist Church of South River in Winter 2012.

- Location within Middlesex County, New Jersey Location within New Jersey Location within the United States
- Location: 64-66 Main Street, South River, New Jersey
- Coordinates: 40°27′1″N 74°22′54″W
- Built: 1805
- NRHP reference No.: 91001926
- NJRHP No.: 1940

Significant dates
- Added to NRHP: January 7, 1992
- Designated NJRHP: November 19, 1991

The Old School Baptist Church and Cemetery is located at 64—66 Main Street in the borough of South River in Middlesex County, New Jersey, United States. The historic frame church was built in 1805 and added to the National Register of Historic Places on January 7, 1992, for its significance in art and religion. From 1923 until 1979, the building was used as a library, the South River War Memorial Free Public Library.
