= Matthias Smock House =

Historic house in New Jersey, United States

- U.S. National Register of Historic Places
- U.S. Historic district – Contributing property
- New Jersey Register of Historic Places
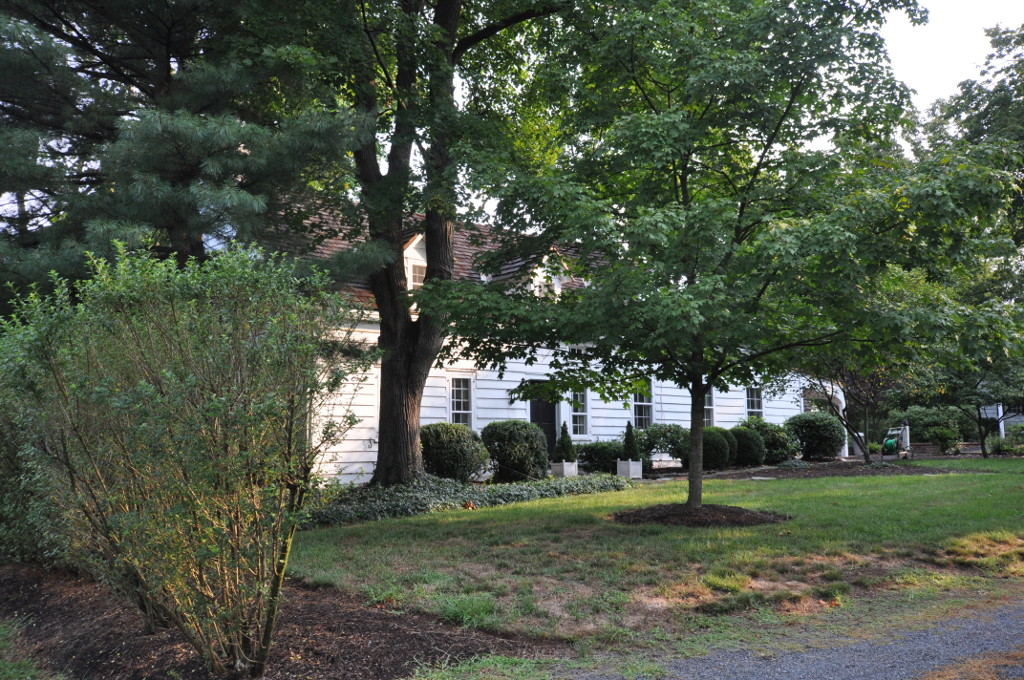

- Location within Middlesex County, New Jersey Location within New Jersey Location within the United States
- Location: 851 River Road; Piscataway, New Jersey
- Coordinates: 40°31′26″N 74°29′22″W
- Area: 1.5 acres (0.61 ha)
- Built: 1720
- Built by: Matthias Smock
- Architectural style: Colonial, Dutch colonial architecture
- Part of: Road Up Raritan Historic District (ID97001146)
- NRHP reference No.: 73001117
- NJRHP No.: 1920

Significant dates
- Added to NRHP: December 4, 1973
- Designated CP: September 18, 1997
- Designated NJRHP: September 6, 1973

The Matthias Smock House is a historic house located at 851 River Road in the township of Piscataway in Middlesex County, New Jersey, United States. It was documented by the Historic American Buildings Survey (HABS) in 1938. The house was added to the National Register of Historic Places on December 4, 1973, for its significance in architecture. It was listed as a contributing property of the Road Up Raritan Historic District in 1997.

== History and description ==
Built by Matthias Smock in 1720, it is the earliest documented house in the county. He lived here until his death in 1727. His son John Smock inherited it and lived here until his death in 1791. It was in the Smock family until 1910. As stated in the nomination form: "it represents a carefully preserved and authentically restored example of early Dutch colonial architecture".

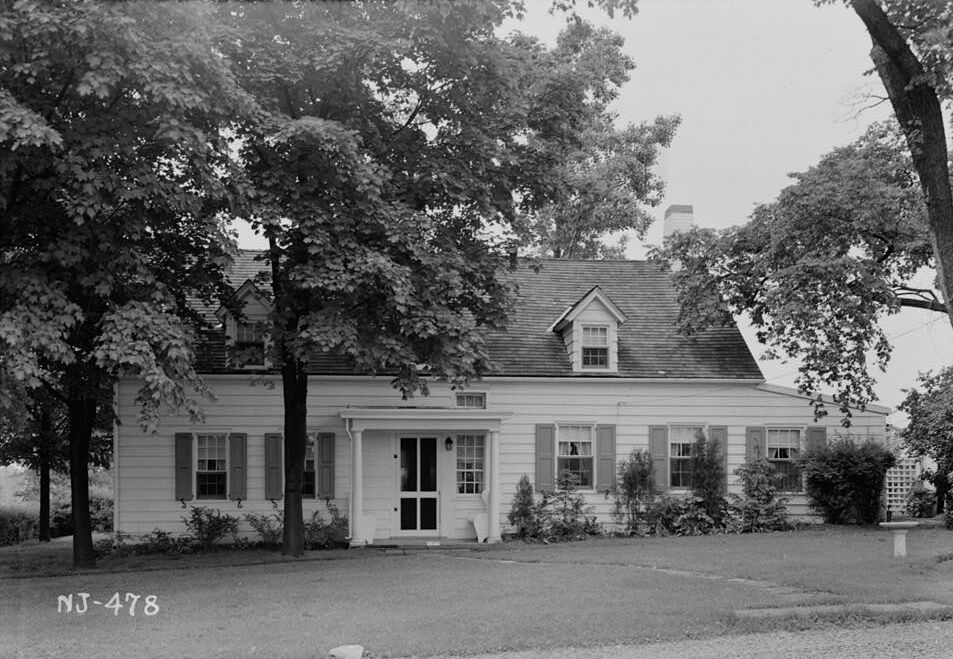
HABS photo from 1938

== See also ==
- National Register of Historic Places listings in Middlesex County, New Jersey
- List of the oldest buildings in New Jersey
