= Poile Zedek Synagogue =

Historic synagogue in New Brunswick, New Jersey

- U.S. National Register of Historic Places
- New Jersey Register of Historic Places
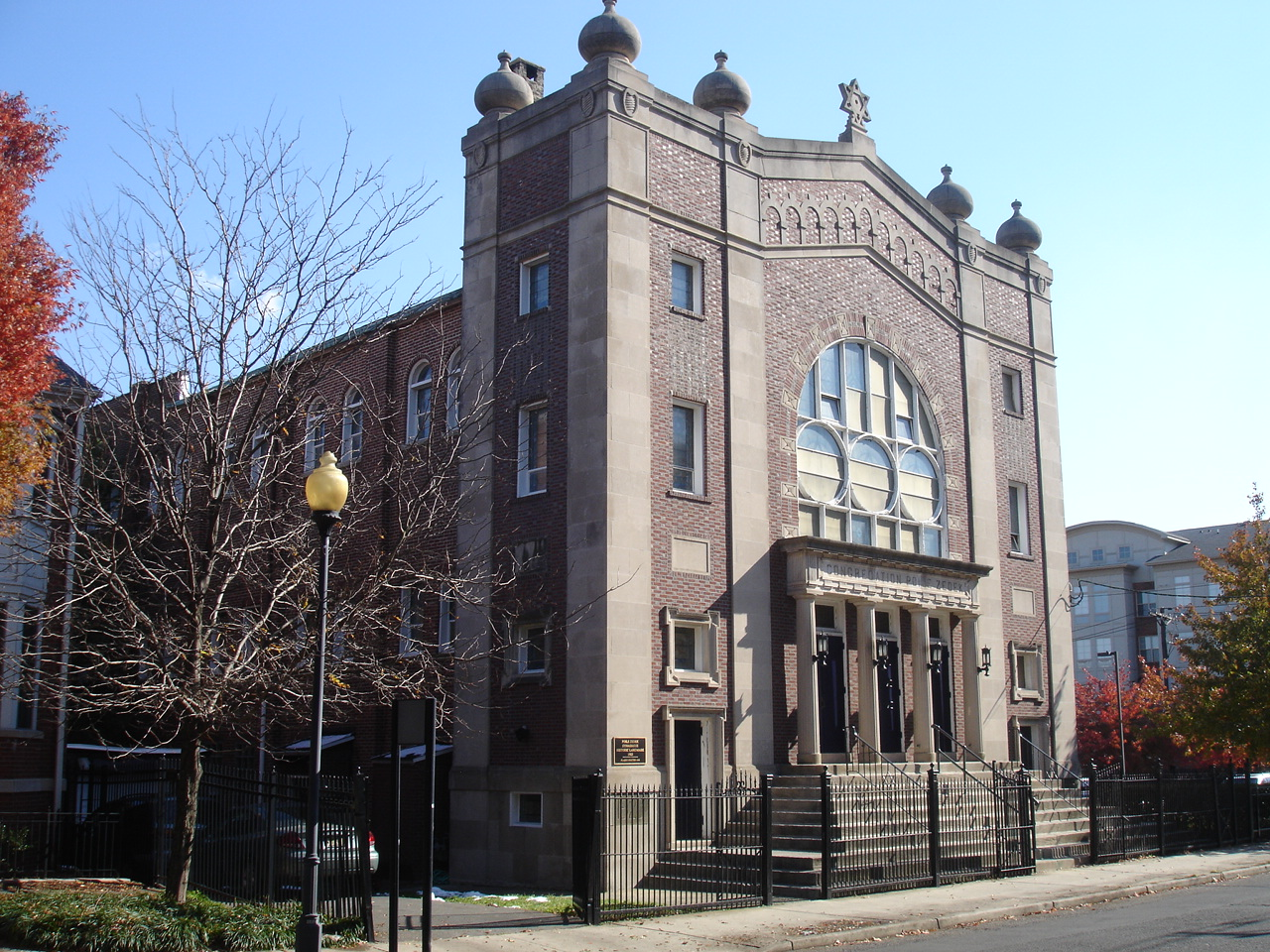
- Polie Zedek Synagogue in fall 2011

- Location within Middlesex County, New Jersey Location within New Jersey Location within the United States
- Location: 145 Neilson Street, New Brunswick, New Jersey
- Coordinates: 40°29′39″N 74°26′31″W
- Area: 1.1 acres (0.45 ha)
- Built: 1923
- Architect: Harry Bach; Morris Frieman
- Architectural style: Romanesque Revival
- NRHP reference No.: 95001189
- NJRHP No.: 1880

Significant dates
- Added to NRHP: October 25, 1995
- Designated NJRHP: September 8, 1995

Poile Zedek Synagogue was a historic synagogue at 145 Neilson Street in New Brunswick, Middlesex County, New Jersey.

The congregation was founded in 1901 by a group of merchants in downtown New Brunswick's Hiram Market district. Originally named the Independent Sick and Death Benefit Association of New Brunswick, the congregation moved to its current location in 1905 and at some point began using the name Poile Zedek ("Workers of Righteousness"). The cornerstone ceremony was held for a new building on August 19, 1923, and the building was completed in 1924. The synagogue was added to the National Register of Historic Places on October 25, 1995 for its significance in architecture and religion. It is a brick building designed with Romanesque Revival style.

A massive fire broke out in the synagogue on October 23, 2015 and gutted the building. A 12-unit apartment building named The Lofts at Neilson Crossings was constructed in 2021 within the preserved exterior walls of the former synagogue.

== Cemetery vandalism ==
Almost 500 gravestones at Poile Zedek's cemetery were vandalized and damaged in January 2008. Four local teenagers were charged, and later sentenced to probation and community service in a juvenile court proceeding.

== Fire ==
A large fire broke out on the first floor of the synagogue on October 23, 2015 at around 4:30 p.m., destroying all but the exterior of the building. One Sefer Torah was rescued by the rabbi before the roof collapsed. According to the rabbi, the external structure remained sound and hoped the building may eventually be repaired. Religious documents and scripts damaged by the fire were later buried in the adjacent cemetery.

== Gallery ==
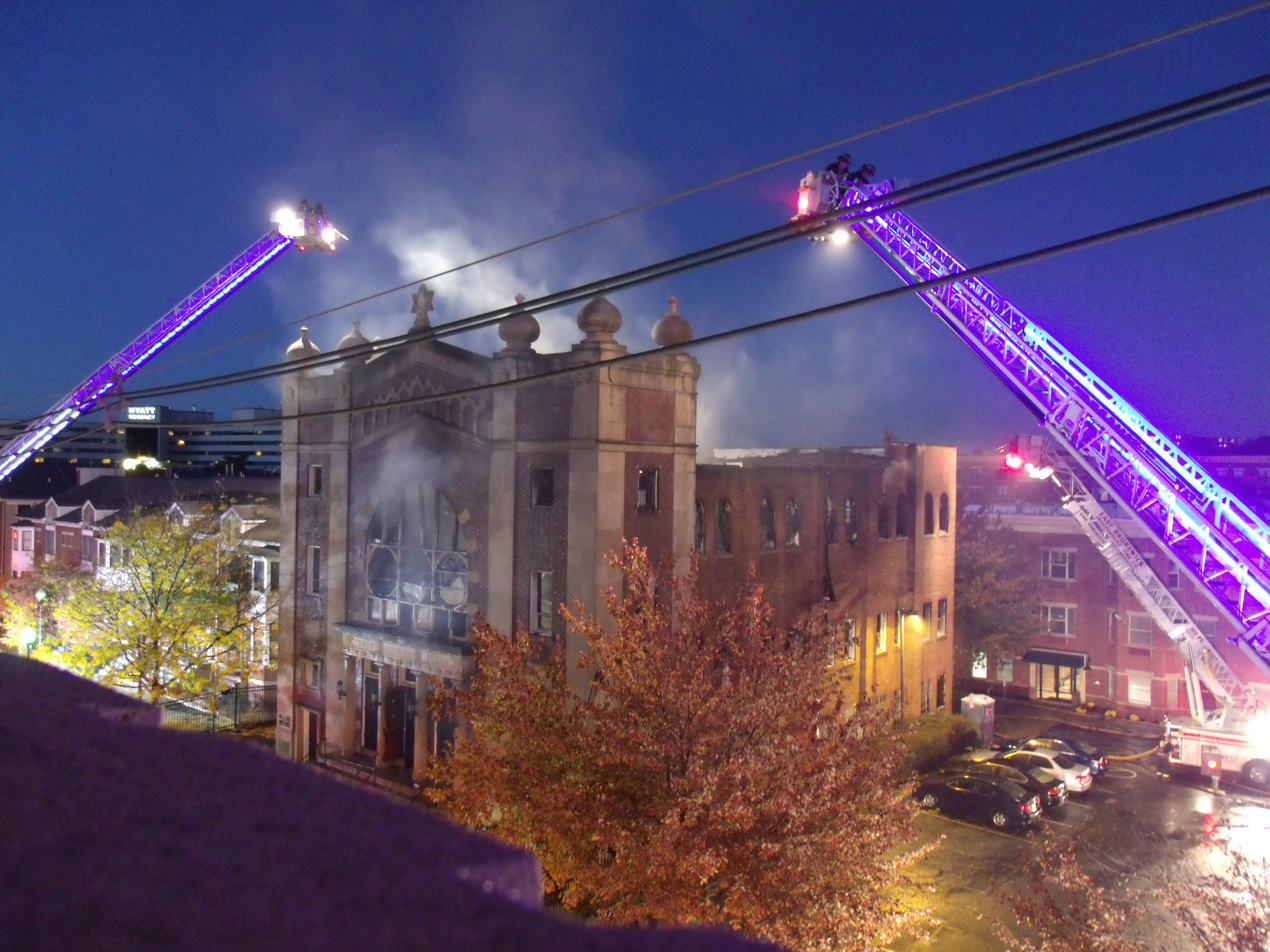
During the October 2015 fire

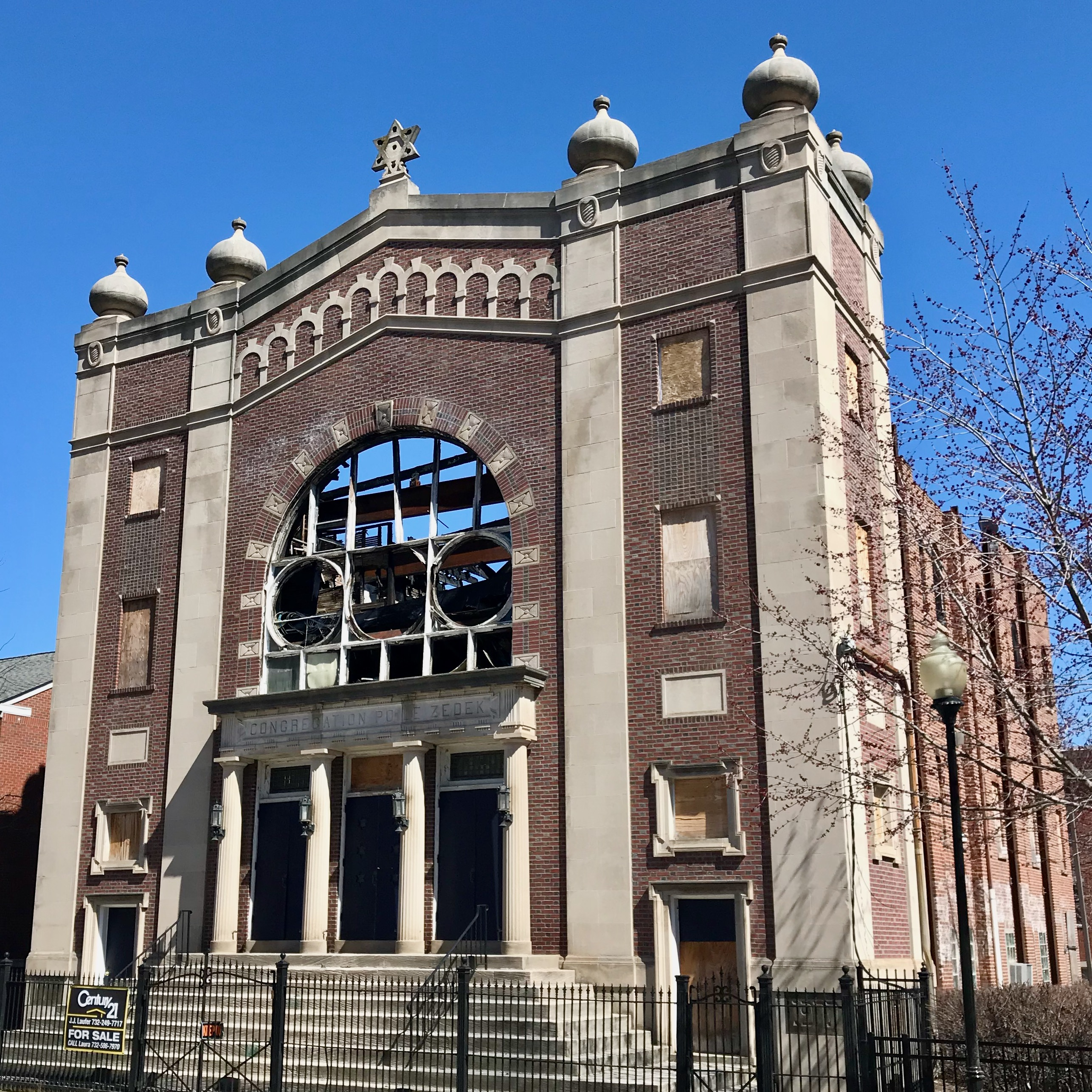
Spring 2018
