= Nagorny (inhabited locality) =

Nagorny (Russian: Наго́рный; masculine), Nagornaya (Наго́рная; feminine), or Nagornoye (Наго́рное; neuter) is the name of several inhabited localities in Russia.

== Modern inhabited localities ==
=== Altai Krai ===
As of 2010, three rural localities in Altai Krai bear this name:

- Nagorny, Biysk, Altai Krai, a settlement under the administrative jurisdiction of the city of krai significance of Biysk
- Nagorny, Pavlovsky District, Altai Krai, a settlement in Prutskoy Selsoviet of Pavlovsky District
- Nagorny, Topchikhinsky District, Altai Krai, a settlement in Krasnoyarsky Selsoviet of Topchikhinsky District

=== Amur Oblast ===
As of 2010, one rural locality in Amur Oblast bears this name:

- Nagorny, Amur Oblast, a settlement in Yekaterinoslavsky Rural Settlement of Oktyabrsky District

=== Chechen Republic ===
As of 2010, one rural locality in the Chechen Republic bears this name:

- Nagornoye, Chechen Republic, a selo in Groznensky District

=== Chelyabinsk Oblast ===
As of 2010, two rural localities in Chelyabinsk Oblast bear this name:

- Nagorny, Sosnovsky District, Chelyabinsk Oblast, a settlement in Solnechny Selsoviet of Sosnovsky District
- Nagorny, Uvelsky District, Chelyabinsk Oblast, a settlement in Kichiginsky Selsoviet of Uvelsky District

=== Chuvash Republic ===
As of 2010, two rural localities in the Chuvash Republic bear this name:

- Nagornoye, Chuvash Republic, a village in Persirlanskoye Rural Settlement of Yadrinsky District
- Nagornaya, Chuvash Republic, a village in Shumshevashskoye Rural Settlement of Alikovsky District

=== Irkutsk Oblast ===
As of 2010, one rural locality in Irkutsk Oblast bears this name:

- Nagorny, Irkutsk Oblast, a settlement in Chunsky District

=== Kaliningrad Oblast ===
As of 2010, five rural localities in Kaliningrad Oblast bear this name:

- Nagornoye, Bagrationovsky District, Kaliningrad Oblast, a settlement in Dolgorukovsky Rural Okrug of Bagrationovsky District
- Nagornoye, Chernyakhovsky District, Kaliningrad Oblast, a settlement in Kaluzhsky Rural Okrug of Chernyakhovsky District
- Nagornoye, Guryevsky District, Kaliningrad Oblast, a settlement in Nizovsky Rural Okrug of Guryevsky District
- Nagornoye, Ozyorsky District, Kaliningrad Oblast, a settlement in Novostroyevsky Rural Okrug of Ozyorsky District
- Nagornoye, Pravdinsky District, Kaliningrad Oblast, a settlement in Domnovsky Rural Okrug of Pravdinsky District

=== Kamchatka Krai ===
As of 2010, one rural locality in Kamchatka Krai bears this name:

- Nagorny, Kamchatka Krai, a settlement in Yelizovsky District

=== Kemerovo Oblast ===
As of 2010, one rural locality in Kemerovo Oblast bears this name:

- Nagorny, Kemerovo Oblast, a settlement in Plotnikovskaya Rural Territory of Prokopyevsky District

=== Khabarovsk Krai ===
As of 2010, one rural locality in Khabarovsk Krai bears this name:

- Nagornoye, Khabarovsk Krai, a selo in Khabarovsky District

=== Kirov Oblast ===
As of 2010, one rural locality in Kirov Oblast bears this name:

- Nagornaya, Kirov Oblast, a village in Izhevsky Rural Okrug of Pizhansky District

=== Kostroma Oblast ===
As of 2010, one rural locality in Kostroma Oblast bears this name:

- Nagornoye, Kostroma Oblast, a village in Tsentralnoye Settlement of Buysky District

=== Krasnoyarsk Krai ===
As of 2010, two rural localities in Krasnoyarsk Krai bear this name:

- Nagornoye, Krasnoyarsk Krai, a selo in Nagornovsky Selsoviet of Sayansky District
- Nagornaya, Krasnoyarsk Krai, a village in Yudinsky Selsoviet of Irbeysky District

=== Kursk Oblast ===
As of 2010, two rural localities in Kursk Oblast bear this name:

- Nagorny, Fatezhsky District, Kursk Oblast, a khutor in Soldatsky Selsoviet of Fatezhsky District
- Nagorny, Oboyansky District, Kursk Oblast, a khutor in Bykanovsky Selsoviet of Oboyansky District

=== Leningrad Oblast ===
As of 2010, one rural locality in Leningrad Oblast bears this name:

- Nagornoye, Leningrad Oblast, a logging depot settlement in Krasnoselskoye Settlement Municipal Formation of Vyborgsky District

=== Lipetsk Oblast ===
As of 2010, one rural locality in Lipetsk Oblast bears this name:

- Nagornoye, Lipetsk Oblast, a selo in Terbunsky Selsoviet of Terbunsky District

=== Republic of Mordovia ===
As of 2010, two rural localities in the Republic of Mordovia bear this name:

- Nagorny, Republic of Mordovia, a settlement in Malobereznikovsky Selsoviet of Romodanovsky District
- Nagornaya, Republic of Mordovia, a village in Starokacheyevsky Selsoviet of Tengushevsky District

=== Moscow Oblast ===
As of 2010, five rural localities in Moscow Oblast bear this name:

- Nagornoye, Petrovskoye Rural Settlement, Klinsky District, Moscow Oblast, a village in Petrovskoye Rural Settlement of Klinsky District
- Nagornoye, Klin Town, Klinsky District, Moscow Oblast, a village under the administrative jurisdiction of the town of Klin, Klinsky District
- Nagornoye, Mytishchinsky District, Moscow Oblast, a settlement under the administrative jurisdiction of the town of Mytishchi, Mytishchinsky District
- Nagornoye, Tsarevskoye Rural Settlement, Pushkinsky District, Moscow Oblast, a settlement in Tsarevskoye Rural Settlement of Pushkinsky District
- Nagornoye, Zelenogradsky Suburban Settlement, Pushkinsky District, Moscow Oblast, a village under the administrative jurisdiction of the suburban settlement of Zelenogradsky, Pushkinsky District

=== Nizhny Novgorod Oblast ===
As of 2010, four rural localities in Nizhny Novgorod Oblast bear this name:

- Nagorny, Nizhny Novgorod Oblast, a settlement in Sitnikovsky Selsoviet of Bor, Nizhny Novgorod Oblast
- Nagornoye, Chkalovsky District, Nizhny Novgorod Oblast, a village in Kuznetsovsky Selsoviet of Chkalovsky District
- Nagornoye, Shakhunsky District, Nizhny Novgorod Oblast, a village in Khmelevitsky Selsoviet of Shakhunsky District
- Nagornoye, Voskresensky District, Nizhny Novgorod Oblast, a village in Bogorodsky Selsoviet of Voskresensky District

=== Novosibirsk Oblast ===
As of 2010, one rural locality in Novosibirsk Oblast bears this name:

- Nagornoye, Novosibirsk Oblast, a selo in Kuybyshevsky District

=== Omsk Oblast ===
As of 2010, one rural locality in Omsk Oblast bears this name:

- Nagornoye, Omsk Oblast, a selo in Nagorno-Ivanovsky Rural Okrug of Tarsky District

=== Orenburg Oblast ===
As of 2010, one rural locality in Orenburg Oblast bears this name:

- Nagorny, Orenburg Oblast, a settlement in Yasnogorsky Selsoviet of Novosergiyevsky District

=== Oryol Oblast ===
As of 2010, two rural localities in Oryol Oblast bear this name:

- Nagorny, Oryol Oblast, a settlement in Zdorovetsky Selsoviet of Livensky District
- Nagornaya, Oryol Oblast, a village in Nizhne-Zalegoshchensky Selsoviet of Zalegoshchensky District

=== Perm Krai ===
As of 2010, one rural locality in Perm Krai bears this name:

- Nagornaya, Perm Krai, a village under the administrative jurisdiction of the city of krai significance of Krasnokamsk

=== Primorsky Krai ===
As of 2010, one rural locality in Primorsky Krai bears this name:

- Nagornoye, Primorsky Krai, a selo in Pozharsky District

=== Pskov Oblast ===
As of 2010, one rural locality in Pskov Oblast bears this name:

- Nagorny, Pskov Oblast, a settlement in Velikoluksky District

=== Rostov Oblast ===
As of 2010, one rural locality in Rostov Oblast bears this name:

- Nagorny, Rostov Oblast, a settlement in Yuzhnenskoye Rural Settlement of Martynovsky District

=== Ryazan Oblast ===
As of 2010, two rural localities in Ryazan Oblast bear this name:

- Nagornoye, Ryazhsky District, Ryazan Oblast, a selo in Nagornovsky Rural Okrug of Ryazhsky District
- Nagornoye, Rybnovsky District, Ryazan Oblast, a village in Baturinsky Rural Okrug of Rybnovsky District

=== Sakha Republic ===
As of 2010, one urban locality in the Sakha Republic bears this name:

- Nagorny, Sakha Republic, an urban-type settlement in Neryungrinsky District

=== Samara Oblast ===
As of 2010, one rural locality in Samara Oblast bears this name:

- Nagorny, Samara Oblast, a settlement in Shentalinsky District

=== Saratov Oblast ===
As of 2010, one rural locality in Saratov Oblast bears this name:

- Nagorny, Saratov Oblast, a settlement in Lysogorsky District

=== Stavropol Krai ===
As of 2010, one rural locality in Stavropol Krai bears this name:

- Nagorny, Stavropol Krai, a khutor in Krasny Selsoviet of Grachyovsky District

=== Republic of Tatarstan ===
As of 2010, two rural localities in the Republic of Tatarstan bear this name:

- Nagorny, Republic of Tatarstan, a settlement in Cheremshansky District
- Nagornoye, Republic of Tatarstan, a village in Almetyevsky District

=== Tyumen Oblast ===
As of 2010, one rural locality in Tyumen Oblast bears this name:

- Nagorny, Tyumen Oblast, a settlement in Ivanovsky Rural Okrug of Uvatsky District

=== Udmurt Republic ===
As of 2010, one rural locality in the Udmurt Republic bears this name:

- Nagorny, Udmurt Republic, a vyselok under the administrative jurisdiction of Igra Settlement Council of Igrinsky District

=== Ulyanovsk Oblast ===
As of 2010, one rural locality in Ulyanovsk Oblast bears this name:

- Nagorny, Ulyanovsk Oblast, a settlement in Nikulinsky Rural Okrug of Nikolayevsky District

=== Vladimir Oblast ===
As of 2010, three rural localities in Vladimir Oblast bear this name:

- Nagorny, Gus-Khrustalny District, Vladimir Oblast, a settlement in Gus-Khrustalny District
- Nagorny, Petushinsky District, Vladimir Oblast, a settlement in Petushinsky District
- Nagornoye, Vladimir Oblast, a village in Sudogodsky District

=== Volgograd Oblast ===
As of 2010, one rural locality in Volgograd Oblast bears this name:

- Nagorny, Volgograd Oblast, a settlement in Verkhnedobrinsky Selsoviet of Kamyshinsky District

=== Vologda Oblast ===
As of 2010, two rural localities in Vologda Oblast bear this name:

- Nagornoye, Ust-Kubinsky District, Vologda Oblast, a village in Zadneselsky Selsoviet of Ust-Kubinsky District
- Nagornoye, Vologodsky District, Vologda Oblast, a village in Spassky Selsoviet of Vologodsky District

=== Voronezh Oblast ===
As of 2010, one rural locality in Voronezh Oblast bears this name:

- Nagornoye, Voronezh Oblast, a khutor in Morozovskoye Rural Settlement of Rossoshansky District

=== Yaroslavl Oblast ===
As of 2010, two rural localities in Yaroslavl Oblast bear this name:

- Nagorny, Yaroslavl Oblast, a settlement in Teleginsky Rural Okrug of Yaroslavsky District
- Nagornoye, Yaroslavl Oblast, a village in Kurbsky Rural Okrug of Yaroslavsky District

=== Zabaykalsky Krai ===
As of 2010, one rural locality in Zabaykalsky Krai bears this name:

- Nagorny, Zabaykalsky Krai, a settlement in Nerchinsky District

== Historical inhabited localities ==
- Nagorny, a former urban-type settlement in Altai Krai; since 2004—a part of the city of Biysk
- Nagorny, a former urban-type settlement in Chukotka Autonomous Okrug; since 2000—a part of the urban-type settlement of Beringovsky
