= Japanese cemeteries and cenotaphs =

Cemeteries and cenotaphs of the Japanese diaspora

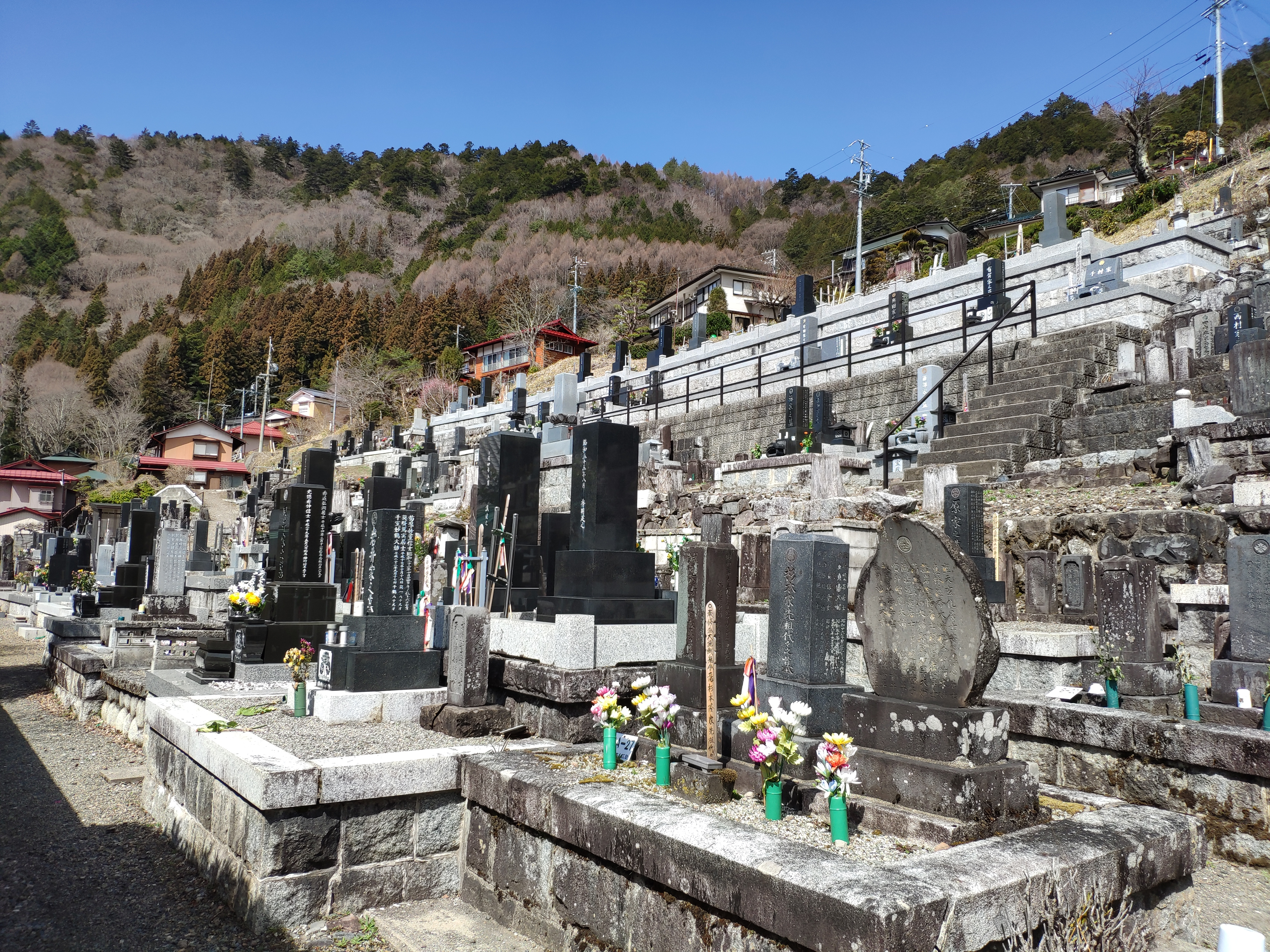
Le cimetière du temple Chofukuji (長福寺) à Kiso Fukushima (木曽福島)

Many Japanese cemeteries (日本人墓地, Nihonjin bochi) and cenotaphs are located outside of Japan for Japanese people who have died in war or other historical events. This article lists graves, tombs and burial places.

== History ==
The oldest known Japantown featuring a Japanese cemetery is in Ayutthaya, Thailand, which was established between the 14th and 18th centuries. The oldest known Japanese national recorded by name and buried outside Japan is the early explorer Yamada Nagamasa.

Wars, particularly World War II, have accounted for a majority of the Japanese burial sites located outside of Japan. There is a cemetery for the Imperial Japanese Navy in Malta, multiple sites for POWs in Siberia, and many Pacific War sites, which include Japanese cemeteries, cenotaphs, and remains in the Nanpō Islands, the Philippines, New Guinea, and other Pacific Islands. There have been multiple efforts by veteran organizations and the Japanese government to return remains to living relatives. The Japanese government's "Ministry of Health, Labour and Welfare" conducted a public project to search and collect the remains of war dead to bring the remains back to Japan.

Monuments to victims of the United States' internment of citizens of Japanese ancestry are prevalent in the Western United States.

== Asia ==
=== Afghanistan ===
- Jalalabad outskirt, Gamberi park: Tetsu Nakamura (中村 哲, Nakamura Tetsu) Doctor Serve Nakamura Memorial Tower, built in Jan. 2020.

=== Bangladesh ===
- Cemetery in Comilla District, Chittagong Division and other locations; Search and collect the remains project learned 43 tombs are Japanese, searching since 2014. Bangladesh government granted permission to Japan for the collection of remains of war dead in July 2024, then the first collection from tomb of Cemetery in Comilla District to be scheduled for 24 war dead remains in November 2024.

=== Bhutan ===
- Paro: Burial place with the pagoda of botanist Keiji Nishioka (西岡京治)

=== Cambodia ===
- Phnom Penh: Cenotaph, Haruyuki Takada (高田 晴行), a police officer who died in the line of duty while participating in the United Nations Transitional Authority in Cambodia in Phnom Penh.
- Siem Reap Province: Tomb, Taizo Ichinose
- Kampong Thom City, Kampong Thom Province: Atsu Elementary and Junior High School and monument A in a garden bearing the name Atsuhito Nakata. It was built by his father with donations from Japanese people and based on the wishes of the local people (instead of the initial idea of using it for food supplies after a flood in 1998).

=== China ===
- Hong Kong: Japanese cemetery area in Hong Kong Cemetery; 465 tombs of Japanese who died in Hong Kong from 1878 to 1945.
- Fangzheng County, Heilongjiang: Sino-Japanese Friendship Forest (Chinese: 中日友好园林), originally Fangzheng Japanese Cemetery (方正地区日本人公墓).
- Tengchong, Yunnan: Mountain pass of Japanese tombs (日本人の墓の峠), referred to as such by elder people in this area; interred those killed in action in the Battle of Mount Song and Battle of Lamèng･Tengchong(Japanese ja:拉孟・騰越の戦い)(Chinese zh:騰衝戰役) at Lamèng (拉孟), Longling County, Baoshan, Yunnan and Tengchong (騰越).

=== India ===
- Imphal: Cenotaph for Japanese war casualties in the Battle of Imphal (Japanese: インパール作戦戦没者勇士の碑, Hepburn: Inpaaru sakusen senbotsusha yuushi no hi)).
- Worli, Mumbai: Mumbai Japanese cemetery; 3,000 Japanese lived in the Mumbai area to procure cotton in the early Shōwa period. Most of the remains and property of the deceased were brought back to Japan, and the remains of only 30 people remain in Mumbai as of 2008.

=== Indonesia ===
- Jakarta - Kalibata Heroes' Cemetery: Honors ex-Japanese soldiers of the Pacific War who participated in the Indonesian National Revolution.
- Tabanan Regency: Cemetery park that honors Japanese former soldiers of the Pacific War who participated in the Indonesian National Revolution, Taman Pujaan Bangsa Margarana (マルガ英雄墓地公園, Maruga eiyu bochi kouen)).
- Wakde - About 600 Japanese soldier remains of Battle of Wakde, only a few number of remains returned to Japan as of August 2025.

=== Kazakhstan ===
- Karaganda: Burial cenotaph in honor of POWs (Heiwa chinkon Nihonjin maisouhi (平和鎮魂 日本人埋葬碑))

=== Laos ===
- Vientiane Province, Nam Ngum Dam: The grave site of several Japanese engineers surveying possible dam locations who died in December 1960 when their boat overturned. The burial site is in close proximity to the dam.

=== Malaysia ===
==== Peninsular Malaysia ====
- Ipoh Japanese cemetery
- Johor Bahru Japanese cemetery
- Kuala Lumpur Japanese cemetery. Cenotaph for the people who died on Japan Airlines Flight 715.
- Kuala Terengganu Japanese cemetery
- Malacca Japanese cemetery
- Penang Japanese cemetery

==== East Malaysia ====
- Kota Kinabalu Japanese cemetery
- Kuching Japanese cemetery
- Labuan, Borneo, Labuan Peace Park: Monument for war casualties in the Borneo war (ボルネオ戦没者の碑, Boruneo senbotsusha no hi) for the 12,000 men who died during the war in Borneo and the surrounding ocean area. Constructed by the Japanese government with the cooperation of government of Malaysia and the government of Sabah in September 1982.
- Miri Japanese cemetery (in Tun Datu Tuanku Haji Bujang College)
- Sandakan Japanese cemetery
- Tawau Japanese cemetery

=== Mongolia ===
To resolve the lack of labor, the Mongolian government requested to transfer POWs in October and December 1945, and approximately 12,318 Japanese prisoners were forced to work, from which more than 1,600 have died. There are 16 Japanese cemeteries including those listed below.

- Altanbulag Selenge Province Japanese cemetery
- Sükhbaatar Japanese cemetery
- Ulaanbaatar, Cenotaph of Japanese at Danbadalja (ダンバダルジャー日本人慰霊碑, Danbadarujya Nihonjin ireihi) and Cenotaph of Japanese (日本人死亡者慰霊碑, Nihonjin shibousha ireihi), for approximately 1,700 POWs who died after the war ended. They were constructed by the Japanese government in October 2001.)

Naruhito, Emperor of Japan, and Empress Masako mourning on 8 July 2025.

- Bojiruburan (ホジルブラン) Japanese cemetery
- Nanaiha (ナライハ) burial (12 Japanese)

=== Myanmar ===
- Yangon Japanese cemetery: For Karayuki-san and Pacific War casualties. Monument of Peace, Burma (ビルマ平和記念碑, Biruma heiwa kinen hi), a peace memorial to the approximately 190,000 Japanese who died during war. It was constructed by the Japanese government in March 1981 before being moved and expanded in size by the Myanmar government in March 1998.)

=== Nepal ===
- Mustang District: Toru Kondo (近藤亨) contributed to the development of the Mustang District.

=== North Korea ===
Cemetery and burial place of Japanese who lived in the South Korea area before and after World War II. There are 71 cemeteries and burial places in North Korea.

- Suburb of Pyongyang: Yongsan cemetery (龍山墓地); 2,421 people evacuated to Pyongyang after the end of World War II, August 15, 1945, and died in the period of October 1945 to April 1946 due to cold temperatures and/or illness.
- Hamhung: Cemetery and burial place.

=== Philippines ===
One of the bloodiest battlefields of the Pacific War; there are many cenotaphs.

- Luzon: Approximately 270 cenotaphs in various locations.

Kalayaan – Cenotaph of those who died in the Philippine war (比島戦没者の碑, fuiripin senbutsusha no hi), to commemorate approximately 518,000 Japanese war dead in the Battle of Luzon. Constructed by the Japanese government in March 1973.

- Visayas: Approximately 110 cenotaphs in various locations; Japanese casualties of Battle of the Visayas.
- Mindanao: Approximately 20 cenotaphs in various locations; Japanese casualties of Battle of Mindanao.
- Leyte: Cenotaph in Tacloban, Ormoc and various locations. approximately 80,000 Japanese killed in action out of 520,000 casualties in the Battle of Leyte. Guanyin, Madonna Maria (マドンナマリア観音, Madonna Maria Kanon), is a peace commemoration statue between Asia, including the Philippines, and Japan in the Kanfuraw Hill where Tacloban City hall is located. There is Isao Yamazoe (山添 勇夫) Shrine in Dulag Airfield.
- Guiuan, Eastern Samar, Samar: Cenotaph in Dumpao Beach.

=== Russia (Asia region) ===
- Primorsky Krai: 146 Japanese cemeteries and burial places.
- Norilsk, Krasnoyarsk Krai: Cenotaph of a deceased POW father and others.
- Yuzhno-Sakhalinsk, Sakhalin Oblast: Japanese cemetery, located midway between downtown and the airport.
- Smirnykh, Sakhalin Oblast: Cenotaph for Sakhalin-Kuril Islands war casualties (樺太・千島戦没者慰霊碑, Karafuto･Chishima Senbotsusha ireihi) (Constructed by the Japanese government in November 1996.)
- Former Maokacho (真岡町, Maokacho), Kholmsk, Sakhalin Oblast: Cenotaph constructed at the location of a former Japanese cemetery, by affiliated Maokacho in August 1995.
- Nagornaya street, Nakhodka: Japanese cemetery.
- Listvyanka, Irkutsky District, Irkutsk Oblast, Khabarovsk: Cenotaph of the Japanese (日本人死亡者慰霊碑, Nihonjin shibousha ireihi); approximately 60,000 remembered as POWs in Siberia. It was constructed by the Japanese government in July 1995.
- Irkutsk Oblast: Cenotaph of approximately 40 buried.
- Amur Oblast: Cenotaph of approximately 41 buried.

=== Singapore ===
- Japanese Cemetery Park

=== South Korea ===
- Geumjeong District, Busan Metropolitan City: Cenotaph of Japanese immigrants (日本人塚移安之碑, Nihonjin tuka ian no hi)
- Port Hamilton: Japanese cemetery removed after the Treaty of San Francisco

=== Sri Lanka ===
- Colombo: Japanese Cemetery area in Kanatte Cemetery - Requiem cenotaph for Killed in action on World War II (第二次大戦戦没者鎮魂碑) and Cenotaph for Killed in action of Imperial Japanese Army (大日本帝国陸軍戦死者慰霊碑) built in 1965 and 1979 respectively.

=== Taiwan ===
- Tainan: Houkakuji temple (宝覚寺)'s Japanese columbarium. The former Japanese cemetery (Chinese: 三板橋墓地) before was exhumed and displacement took place in 1997. The tomb of Akashi Motojiro was then moved to the cemetery (福音山基督教墓地) in Sanzhi District, Taipei, other remains were moved to Houkakuji temple in Taichung.
- Sanzhi District, Taipei: tomb of Akashi Motojiro
- Taipei: Tomb of Mr. Rokushin (六氏先生)
- Taipei: Chuuwa Zenji (中和禪寺), Japanese cremated remains morgue
- Tainan: Tomb of Yoichi Hatta and his wife.
- Kaohsiung: Japanese cemetery in Fudingjin
- Hualien County: Japanese cemetery of Houden immigration village (豊田移民村日本人墓地)
- Hualien County: Konohon company communal cemetery (コノホン社共同墓地)
- Pingtung County Chouonji temple (潮音寺): At Bashi Channel, Imperial Japanese Navy destroyer Kuretake (呉竹), transport Tamatsu Maru and many other ships that were attacked by the United States Navy during Pacific War time. This area was called the Cemetery of Ships (船の幕場の, Fune no hakaba) in Japan, where more than 100,000 were killed in action. Japanese veteran Hidetsugu Nakajima (中嶋秀次; died 2013) survived for 12 days and was saved in August 1944. He self-funded the construction of the Chouonji temple in 1981 to memorialize compatriots. In August 2015, 60 families of the deceased, Taiwanese, and Japanese attended the ceremony.

=== Tajikistan ===
- Dushanbe, Tajikistan office of United Nations Development Programme: Cenotaph of Yutaka Akino (ja:秋野豊), voluntary participant from the Japanese Ministry of Foreign Affairs staff, killed in duty of United Nations Mission of Observers in Tajikistan.

=== Thailand ===
- Ayutthaya Japanese cemetery
- Kanchanaburi: Cenotaph of Kanchanaburi (カンチャナブリー慰霊塔, Kanchanaburi ireitou); Japanese soldiers worked to build Mueang Kanchanaburi District Burma Railway, including POWs of Allies of World War II and workers from Southeast Asia. It was built by Japanese army railway workers in 1944. Epitaph is written in Japanese, English, Malay, Tamil, Chinese and Vietnamese.
- Historic Town of Sukhothai and Associated Historic Towns - Japanese stage actress Tomoko Kawashita (ja: 川下 智子, Kawashita Tomoko)(aged 27) had been murdered in Sukhothai Historical Park in 2007. In 2024, family visited there and her father said somehow cenotaph had been altered.

=== Uzbekistan ===
There are 13 Japanese cemeteries in Uzbekistan.

- Andijan
- Angren
- Bekabad
- Bukhara
- Chirchiq
- Fergana
- Kokand
- Tashkent – Tashkent Japanese POWs (Prisoner of war) in Tashkent Yakkasaray citizen cemetery (ヤッカサライ市民墓地内タシケント抑留日本人墓地).

=== Vietnam ===
- Hội An: Hội An Japanese cemetery memorializing 30 years after the Sakoku and the Japanese started foreign trade by the red seal ships. As a result, Japanese residents of Vietnam could not return to Japan and died there.

== Africa ==
=== Madagascar ===
- Two cenotaphs of four Japanese Imperial Japanese Navy killed in Battle of Madagascar in Antsiranana, named Diego-Suarez prior to 1975. First cenotaph for two of four Japanese was constructed in 1976 by the Japanese embassy. Second cenotaph of four was constructed by voluntary efforts of war veterans in 1997.

== Oceania ==
=== Australia ===
- Broome, Western Australia: Burial of approximately 900 Japanese immigrants in the Meiji period from Taiji, Wakayama. The immigrants were in Broome to dive for pearls.
- Cowra: Cemetery of Cowra breakout Japanese.
- Darwin, Northern Territory: Cenotaph of I-121-class submarine.
- Thursday Island, Queensland: Cemetery of Japanese immigrants from the Meiji period to the end of World War II. Primary occupation was diving for pearls.

=== Guam ===
- South Pacific Memorial Park, cenotaph of South Pacific war dead and ossuary built in May 1970.

=== Midway Atoll ===
- Territories of the United States - Tomb of Matagoro SAKURAI (櫻井又五郎) in Meiji era

=== New Zealand ===
- Featherston: cenotaph of Featherston POW camp
- Christchurch: cenotaph of those who died in the 2011 Christchurch earthquake

=== Northern Mariana Islands ===
- Banzai Cliff, North end of Saipan: Cenotaph for war casualties in the central Pacific Ocean (中部太平洋戦没者の碑, Chubu taiheiyou senbotsusha no hi) for 43,000 Japanese killed in action and 12,000 citizens killed in the war regardless of nationality including Japanese migrants to the Saipan, Tinian, Guam islands until the end of the war in 1945. It was constructed by the Japanese government with the cooperation of the Northern Mariana Islands government in March 1974.

=== Papua New Guinea ===
- Wewak: Cenotaph for war casualties in the New Guinea campaign (ニューギニア戦没者の碑, Nyuginia senbotsusya no hi), It commemorates 130,000 Japanese killed in action and 50,000 residents killed in the war. It was constructed by the Japanese government with the cooperation of Papua New Guinea in September 1980.
- Rabaul, New Britain, Bismarck Archipelago: Cenotaph of Japanese killed in action in South Pacific Ocean (南太平洋戦没者の碑, Minami taiheiyo senbotsusha no hi), 200,000 killed in action at the Battle of Rabaul. It was constructed by the Japanese government and the Comrades Association in Arms (戦友会, Senyukai) in September 1980.

=== Marshall Islands ===
- Majuro: Cenotaph for war casualties in the Pacific Ocean (東太平洋戦没者の碑, Higasi taiheiyou senbotsusha no hi). It was constructed by the Japanese government with the cooperation of the government of Republic of the Marshall Islands in March 1984.
- Wotje island, Wotje Atoll: Stele of Sekisei troop death in duty (lit.)Sekiseitai jyunbotusha no hi (ja:赤誠隊殉歿者之碑) of more than 1,000 prisoner from Yokohama prison, in 1939, constructed Wotje Airport and North Field (Tinian) (formerly Hagoi aerodrome (ja:ハゴイ飛行場))

=== New Caledonia ===
- Thio: Burial of 230 Japanese immigrants that came for nickel mining since 1892.
- Burial of the crew of Japanese submarine I-17 killed in action

=== Palau ===
- Peleliu: Cenotaph for war casualties in the West Pacific during the war (西太平洋戦没者の碑, Nishi taiheiyou senbutusya no hi), built in March 1985.

=== Saipan ===
- Banzai Cliff: Cenotaph for war casualties in the Central Pacific (中部太平洋戦没者の碑, Cyubu taiheiyou senbutusya no hi), built in March 1974.

=== Solomon ===
- Guadalcanal: Solomon Peace Commemorative Park, Cenotaph for war casualties in the Solomon Islands (ソロモン諸島方面戦没者慰霊碑, Soromon houmen senbutsusha ireihi) built in 1998.

== North America ==
=== Canada ===
- Cumberland, British Columbia: Cumberland Japanese cemetery. Headstones date back to 1901.

=== Dominican Republic ===
- Dajabón Province: Cemetery of Japanese settlement in the Dominican Republic.

=== United States ===
- Bronx, New York City: Woodlawn Cemetery. Tomb of Hideyo Noguchi, Jōkichi Takamine, and Ryoichiro Arai (新井 領一郎), and others.
- Brooklyn, New York City: Cypress Hills National Cemetery. Tomb of Shido Yamada (山田 志道), representative of former Sony, Tokyo Tsushin Kogyo, in New York, and others.
- Colma, California: Japanese Cemetery. Contains three Kanrin Maru crew members who died during the first Japanese Embassy to the United States, and others.
- Honolulu, Hawaii, Kakaako Waterfront Park: cenotaph of victims of the Ehime Maru and USS Greeneville collision.
- Makiki, Honolulu, Hawaii: Makiki Japanese cemetery built in the early 1900s by Japanese immigrants and the first cemetery of the Imperial Japanese Navy.
- Manzanar, Owens Valley, Inyo County, California: Tomb and cenotaph is near to the visitor center. The cenotaph was built on 15 cent donations from each family in the camp in August 1943. It also holds the remains of six unidentified people.
- Queens, New York City: Mount Olivet Cemetery. Tomb of Toyohiko Takami (高見 豊彦), who founded the Japanese American Welfare Society (紐育共済会) with Jōkichi Takamine in 1914.
- Wakamatsu Tea and Silk Farm Colony, Placerville, California: Grave of Okei Ito, the first known Japanese woman to be buried on American soil. Died 1871.
- Willow Grove Cemetery, New Brunswick, New Brunswick, New Jersey - Taro Kusakabe (ja:日下部太郎), Kijiro Hasegawa (長谷川雉郞), Kosuke Matsukata (松方蘇介), Jinzaburo Obata (ja:小幡甚三郎), Otojiro Irie (入江音次郎), Shinjiro Kawasaki (川崎新次郎), Tatsuzo Sakatani (阪谷達三) and Died young eldest daughter of Saburo Takagi (ja:高木三郎) and his wife.

== South America ==
=== Bolivia ===
- Santa Cruz Department: Japanese cemetery in the Santa Cruz de la Sierra public cemetery.

=== Brazil ===
- São Paulo–Álvares Machado Japanese cemetery.
- Marajó, Pará: Japanese cemetery.
- Ibirapuera Park, São Paulo: Monument to the deceased pioneers of Japanese Immigration

=== Peru ===
- Cañete Province, Lima Region: Casa Blanca Japanese cemetery.

== Europe ==
=== Malta ===
- Tomb of casualties of the 2nd Special Squadron (大日本帝国第二特務艦隊戦死者之墓) in Kalkara Naval Cemetery. Under Anglo-Japanese Alliance, Winston Churchill called for squadron reinforcements of the Imperial Japanese Navy.

=== Russia (Europe region) ===
- Moscow: Donskoy Japanese cemetery in Donskoy Monastery. Tomb of Yasunao Yoshioka (吉岡 安直), Harbin Consul Funao Miyagawa (宮川 舩夫) who died as a POW in Moscow in 1950, and others.

=== United Kingdom ===
- Wales: Cenotaph of the Hirano Maru that was shipwrecked by U-boat on December 5, 1918. The wooden cenotaph was renewed with stone cenotaph on its 100th anniversary on October 4, 2018.

== See also ==
- Japan War-Bereaved Families Association
- Foreign cemeteries in Japan
- Chidorigafuchi National Cemetery
