= Civic Square, New Brunswick =

Populated place in Middlesex County, New Jersey, US

Coordinates: 40.493333°N 74.446389°W

Civic Square is the government district in downtown New Brunswick, the county seat of Middlesex County, New Jersey. Numerous county governmental buildings are located there along with other city and federal public buildings such as New Brunswick City Hall, the New Brunswick Main Post Office, and the New Brunswick Free Public Library. South of New Brunswick Station, it is bounded by the city's theater district, which includes the Mason Gross School of the Arts, the State Theatre, the Crossroads Theatre and George Street Playhouse at NBPAC and the Livingston Avenue Historic District which includes the Henry Guest House and the Willow Grove Cemetery.

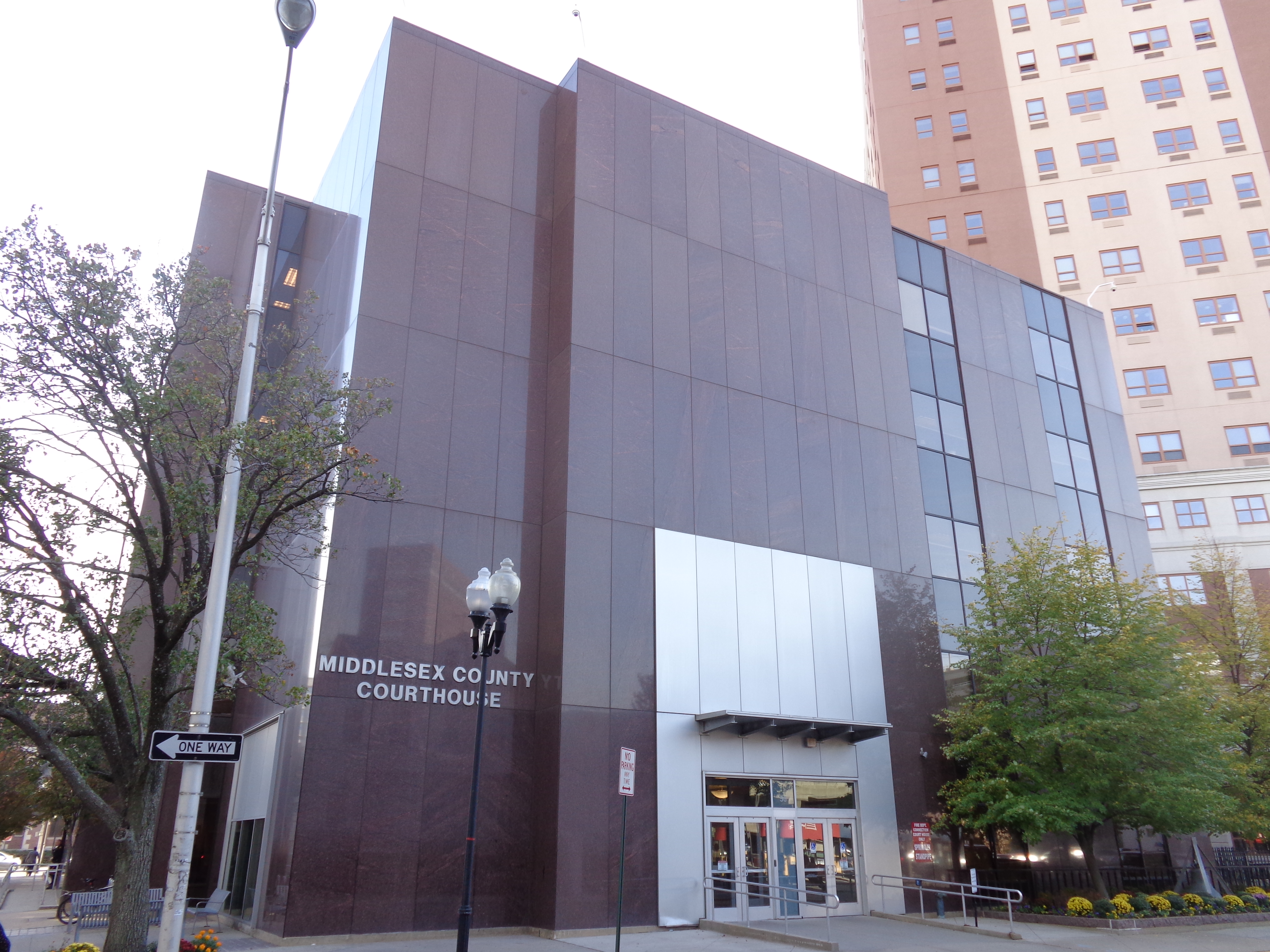
Middlesex County Courthouse

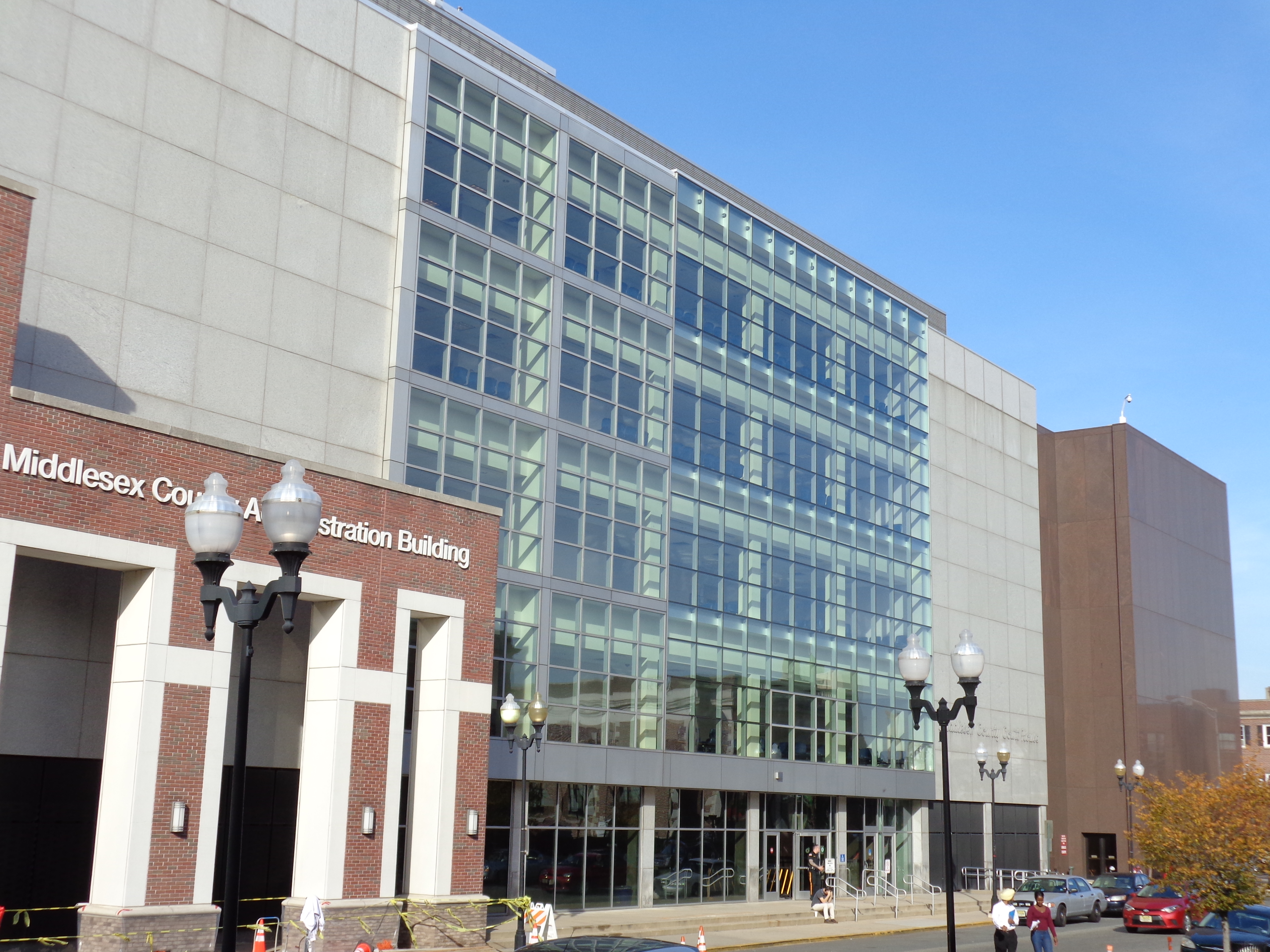
County Administration Building (left) and rear facade of County Courthouse (right)

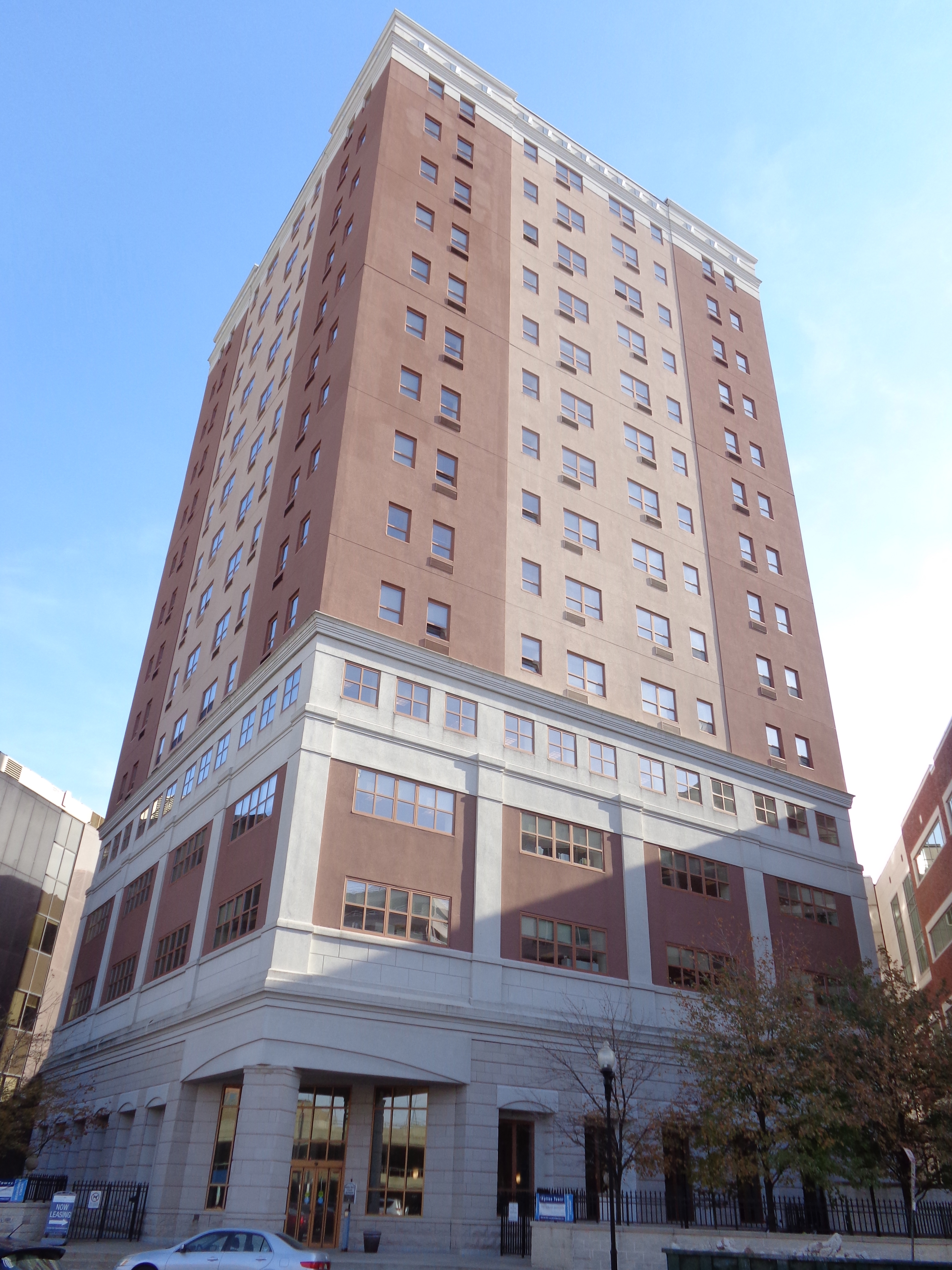
Skyline Tower, the former Administration Building

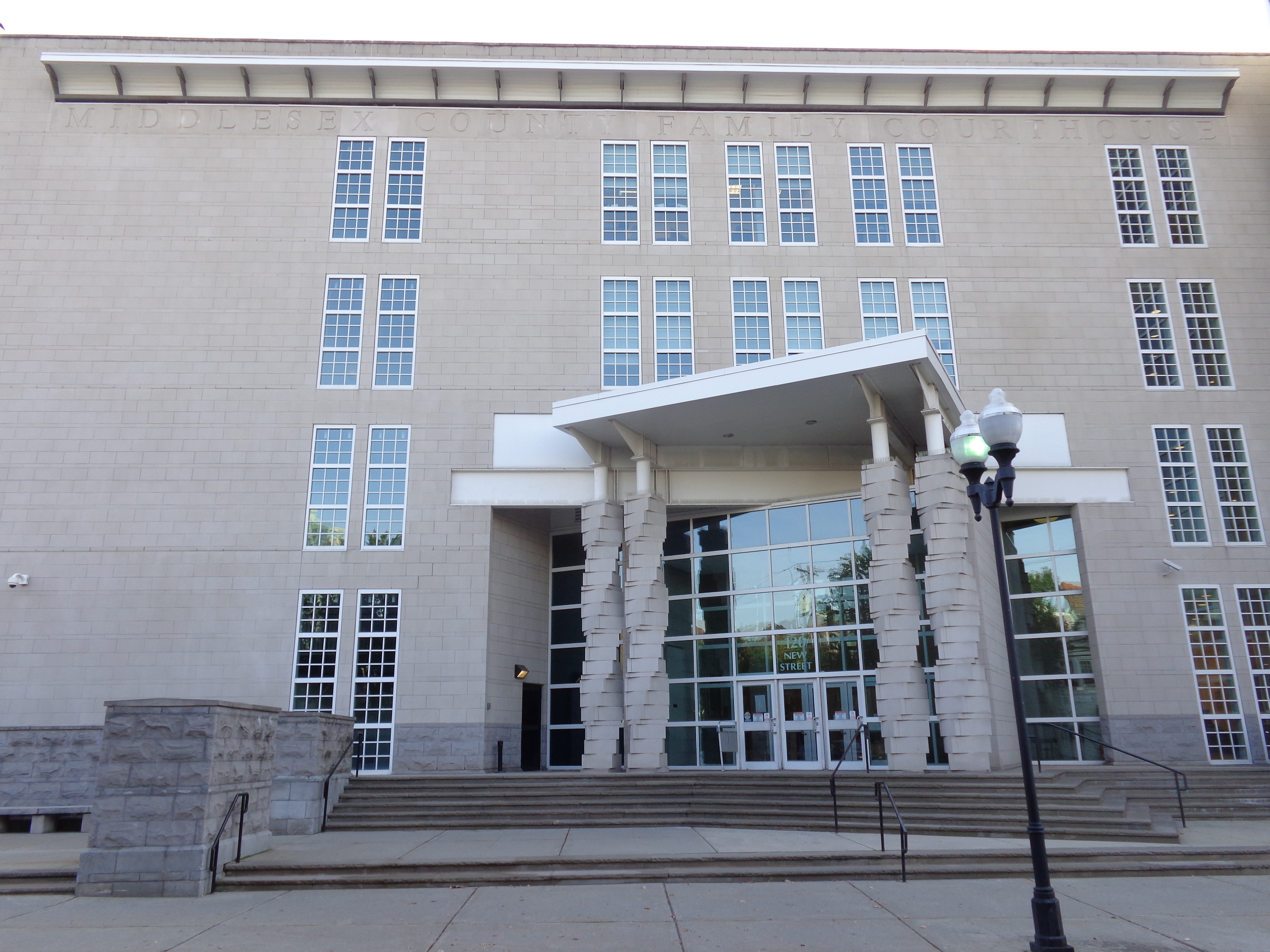
Family Courthouse

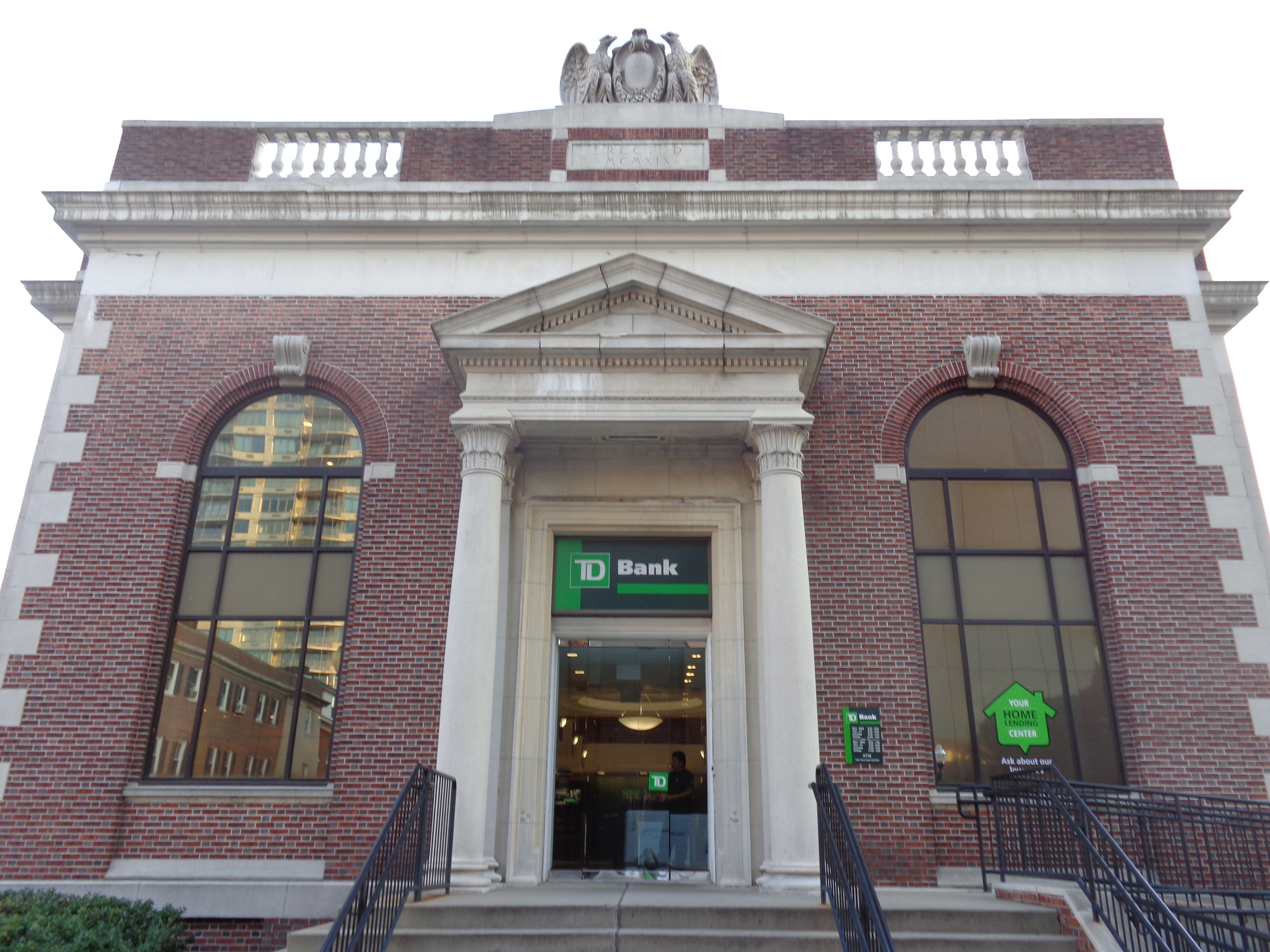
Former County Court House

== Middlesex County Courthouse ==
The last of a series of county courthouses, the Middlesex County Court House was built in 1958. The building was extensively renovated in 2003, including a partial new facade. The County Courthouse houses all Parts of the Law Division of the New Jersey Superior Court (Criminal, Civil, and Special Civil) for the Middesex Vicinage, as well as the General Equity Part of the Middlesex Vicinage Chancery Division.

== Middlesex County Administration Building ==
Skyline Tower, at 14 stories and 59 m (194 ft), was originally built in 1967 as the Middlesex County Administrative Building. It was extensively renovated in 2003 as residential mixed-used building; however, its lower floors continue to house court facilities, including the Records department for the Civil Part of the Law Division and the General Equity Part of the Chancery Division, as well as chambers for those judges of the Appellate Division who sit in New Brunswick. A new Administration Building was completed in 1999.

== Middlesex County Family Courthouse ==
Opened in 2000, Middlesex County Family Courthouse houses the Family Part of the Chancery Division of the Superior Court, the New Brunswick Parking Authority, and the New Brunswick Center of Middlesex County College

== Middlesex County Public Safety Building ==
Completed in May 2000, the Public Safety Building houses the U.S. Postal Service, the New Brunswick Police Department, the New Brunswick Municipal Courts, and the Middlesex County Prosecutor.

== See also ==
- List of tallest buildings in New Brunswick
- National Register of Historic Places listings in Middlesex County, New Jersey
- List of United States federal courthouses in New Jersey
- Government Center, Newark
