= Ashihei Hino =

Japanese writer

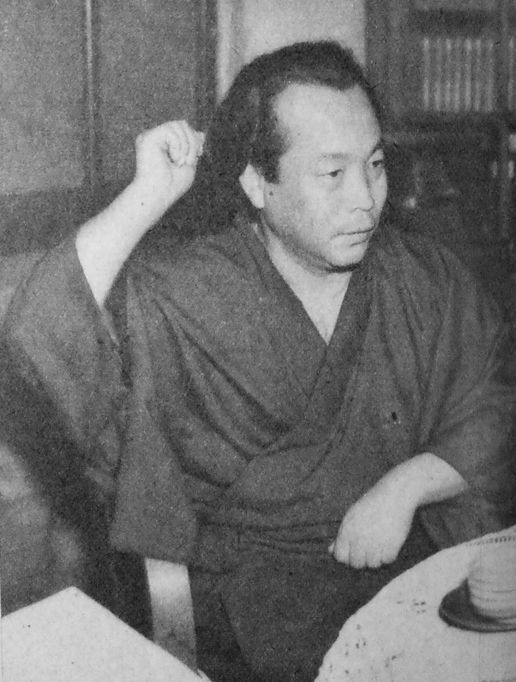
- Hino in 1952
- Born: January 25, 1907; Wakamatsu, Fukuoka Prefecture, Japan
- Died: January 24, 1960 (aged 52)
- Relatives: Tetsu Nakamura (nephew)
- Writing career
- Notable works: Fun'nyōtan (糞尿譚, "Tales of Excrement and Urine"); Kakumei Zengo (革命前後, "Before and After the Revolution"); Mugi to Heitai (麦と兵隊, "Wheat and Soldiers")
- Notable awards: Akutagawa Prize for Tales of Excrement and Urine; Japan Art Academy Prize for Before and After the Revolution and lifetime achievements

Ashihei Hino (火野 葦平, Hino Ashihei) (born 玉井勝則, Tamai Katsunori; 25 January 1907 – 24 January 1960) was a Japanese writer, whose works included depictions of military life during World War II. He was born in Wakamatsu (now Wakamatsu ward, Kitakyūshū) and in 1937 he received the prestigious Akutagawa Prize for one of his novels, Fun'nyōtan (糞尿譚, Tales of Excrement and Urine). At that moment he was a soldier for the Japanese army in China. He then got promoted to the information corps and published numerous works about the daily lives of Japanese soldiers. It is for his war novels that he became famous during (and forgotten after) the war. His book Mugi to Heitai (麦と兵隊, Wheat and Soldiers) sold over a million copies.

Hino committed suicide at the age of 53. His death was first reported to have been from a heart attack, but was later revealed by his family to have been from an overdose of sleeping pills. His birthhouse can be visited nowadays.

== Early life and education ==
Hino was born as Katsunori Tamai (玉井勝則, Tamai Katsunori) on 25 January 1907 in Wakamatsu, Fukuoka Prefecture (now Wakamatsu District in Kitakyushu City) as the family's eldest son. His father was foreman of the Tamai Group (玉井組, Tamai gumi) stevedoring company. Hino had two younger brothers and seven younger sisters. In 1923 at the age of 16, he completed Kokura Prefectural Junior High School and entered Waseda Daiichi High School.

In 1926 at the age of 19, he entered Waseda University's English Literature Department. Along with several other students, he produced Machi (街; "Town"), a literary magazine. The following year, he produced a poetry magazine entitled Seihai (聖杯; "Holy Grail").

In 1928, he enlisted in the Fukuoka 24th Infantry Regiment as an officer candidate. However, upon discovery of a translated work of Vladimir Lenin's among his possessions, Hino was demoted and eventually discharged.

Intending to succeed his father's position with the Tamai Group, Hino withdrew from his studies. He sold all of his textbooks and literature and became absorbed in leftist publications.

In 1930, at 23 years old, he married Ryoko Hibino (日比野良子, Hibino Ryouko). The same year, their eldest son was born with a daughter following in 1932, a second son in 1934, and a third son in 1938.

In March 1931, Hino established the Wakamatsu Port Stevedoring Union and became its General Secretary. In August of that year, the union conducted a cargo handling strike in Dōkai Bay.

In 1932 following the January 28 incident, foreign laborers conducted a strike, prompting the Tamai Group to dispatch Hino to Shanghai, China. He was arrested upon his return to Japan and became distrustful of the Japanese Communist Party, deciding to turn away from leftist politics and back toward literature.

== Career ==
In 1934, Hino began contributing to the Japanese poetry magazine Transit (とらんしっと, also meaning "theodolite"), primarily composing prose poetry. During this time, he began to use the name Ashihei Hino (火野葦平, Hino Ashihei).

In October 1937, Hino's novel Tales of Excrement and Urine (糞尿譚, Fun'nyōtan) was published. The previous month, he had been conscripted to fight in the Second Sino-Japanese War. In October 1937 he landed at Hangzhou Bay and in December 1937 he entered Hangzhou, China.

In February 1938, Hino won the 6th Akutagawa Prize for Tales of Excrement and Urine.

Hino became known for his vivid portrayal of soldiers' humanity during battle. Mugi to Heitai (麦と兵隊, Wheat and Soldiers), his account of the Battle of Xuzhou in May 1938, which he sent from the battlefield, contributed to his fame and popularity. It was translated into English and praised by American novelist Pearl S. Buck, who had grown up in China as the daughter of missionaries.

In 1939, Hino retired from military service and returned to Japan but continued to be known as a soldier-writer. He continued to depict military life on various all fronts. Some of his works were published in English: The Sentry Line (歩哨線, Hosho sen), Mud and Soldiers (土と兵隊, Tsuchi to Heitai), Flower and Soldiers (花と兵隊, Hana to Heitai), Sea and Soldiers (海と兵隊, Umi to Heitai), and Corn and Soldiers (麦と兵隊, Mugi to Heitai).

After World War II, Hino came under aggressive scrutiny for having been a "war crimes writer" and was banned from holding public office from 1948 to 1950. His work during this time and after the lifting of the ban included his autobiographical film Hana to Ryuu (花と竜, Flowers and Dragons), which depicted the severe conditions of boyhood in Kyūshū, and Kakumei Zengo (革命前後, Before and After the Revolution), which addressed his own moral responsibility in the war. His work demonstrated his literary ability and he regained some of his public stature. In 1960, after Hino's death, he was awarded the Japan Art Academy Prize for Kakumei Zengo and his other lifetime achievements.

== Later life ==
Hino died in his home office on January 24, 1960, following an overdose on sleeping pills. Following Hino's death, a friend who had been concerned about Hino's behavior visited Hino's home and discovered a note entitled "Health Memo" (in English). In Japanese, Hino had written that he would die because of "some vague anxiety" (或る漠然とした不安) and referenced Japanese writer and Akutagawa Prize namesake Ryūnosuke Akutagawa, who had attributed his own suicide in 1927 to a "vague anxiety."

Hino's cause of death was said to have been a heart attack until his family acknowledged his suicide to the Japanese press in 1972.
