= Livingston Avenue Historic District =

Historic district in Middlesex County, New Jersey, US

- U.S. National Register of Historic Places
- U.S. Historic district
- New Jersey Register of Historic Places
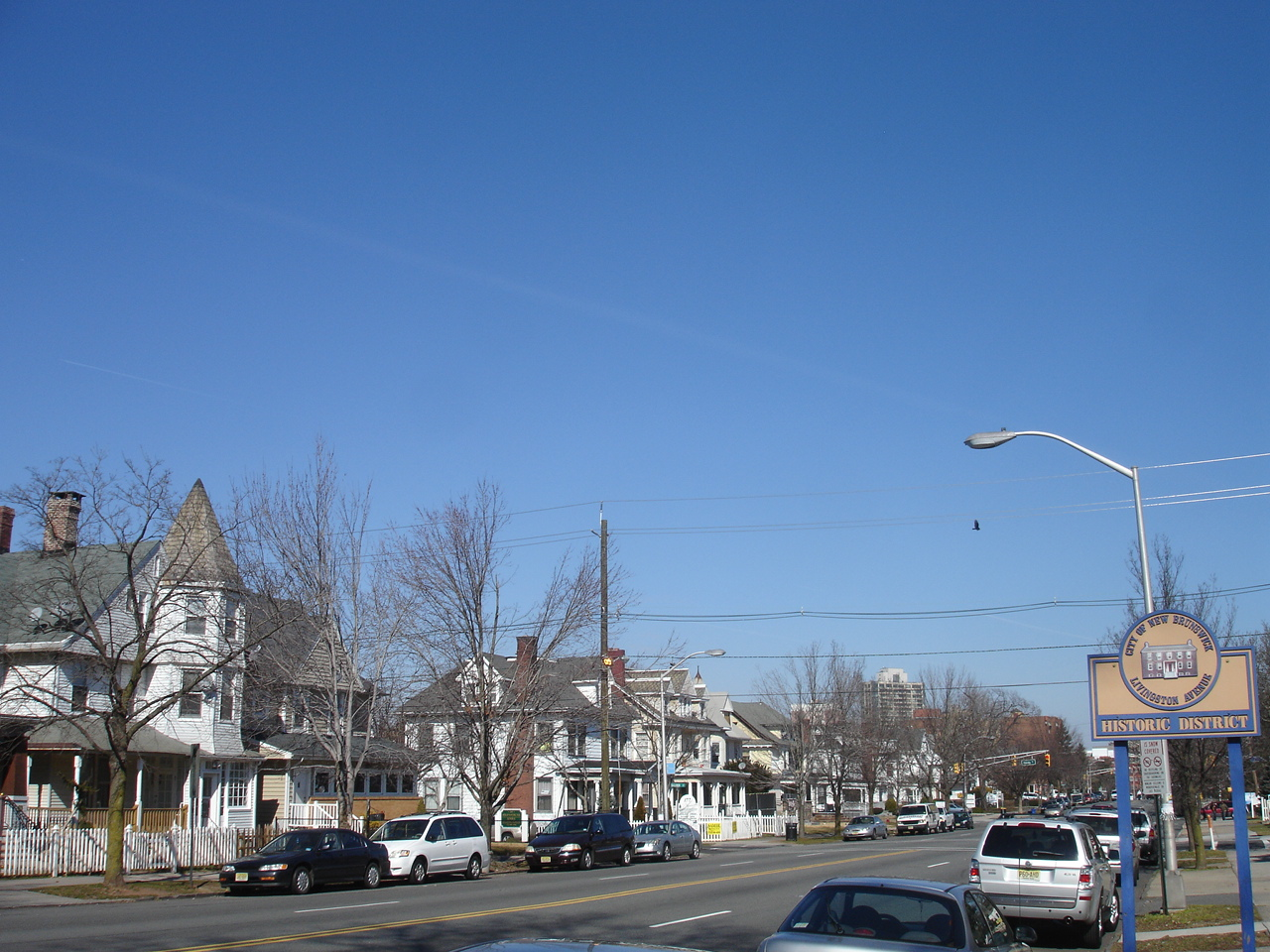

- Location within Middlesex County, New Jersey Location within New Jersey Location within the United States
- Location: Area surrounding Livingston Avenue between Hale and Morris Streets; New Brunswick, New Jersey
- Coordinates: 40.489167°N 74.448056°W
- Area: 32 acres (13 ha)
- Architect: Louis H. Giele; George K. Parsell
- Architectural style: Queen Anne, Colonial Revival, Classical Revival
- NRHP reference No.: 96000072
- NJRHP No.: 3307

Significant dates
- Added to NRHP: February 16, 1996
- Designated NJRHP: December 8, 1995

The Livingston Avenue Historic District is a 32-acre (13 ha) historic district located along Livingston Avenue between Hale and Morris Streets in the city of New Brunswick in Middlesex County, New Jersey, United States. The district was added to the National Register of Historic Places on February 16, 1996, for its significance in architecture, social history, and urban history from 1870 to 1929. It has 58 contributing buildings and two contributing sites, including the Willow Grove Cemetery, the Henry Guest House, and the New Brunswick Free Public Library. The John B. Drury House was built around 1888.

== Gallery ==
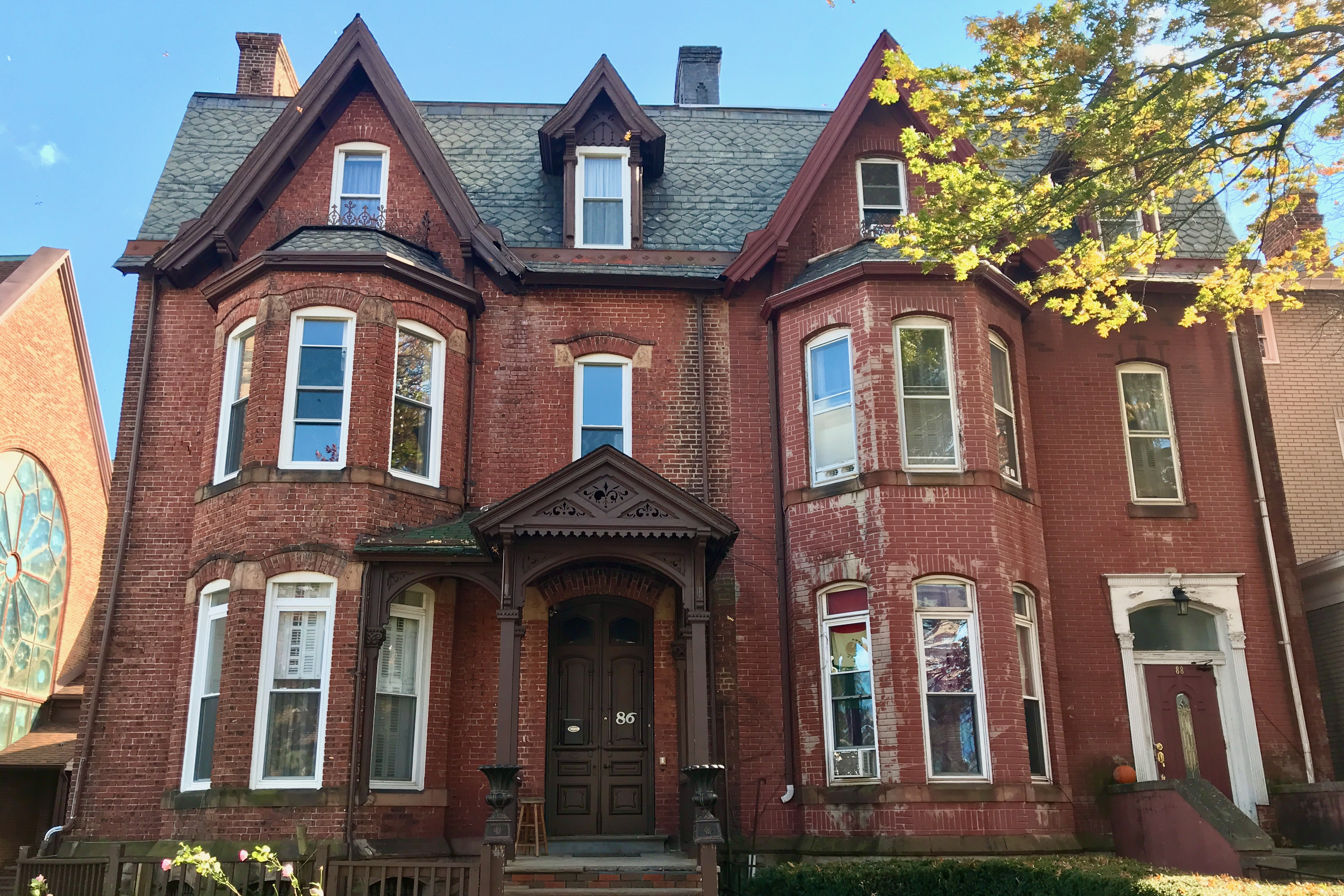
John B. Drury House, Victorian style

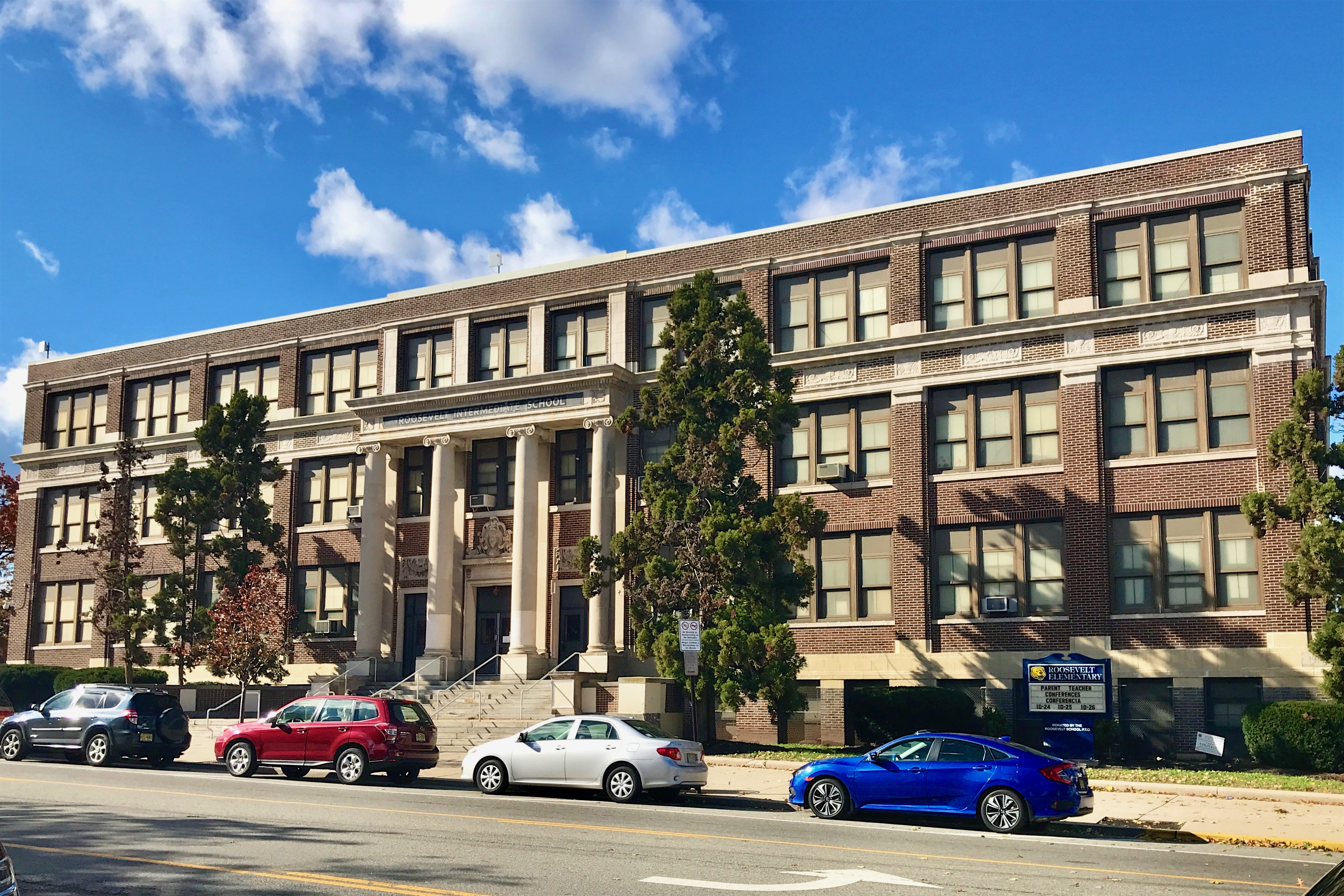
Roosevelt Intermediate School, Neo-Classical Revival style

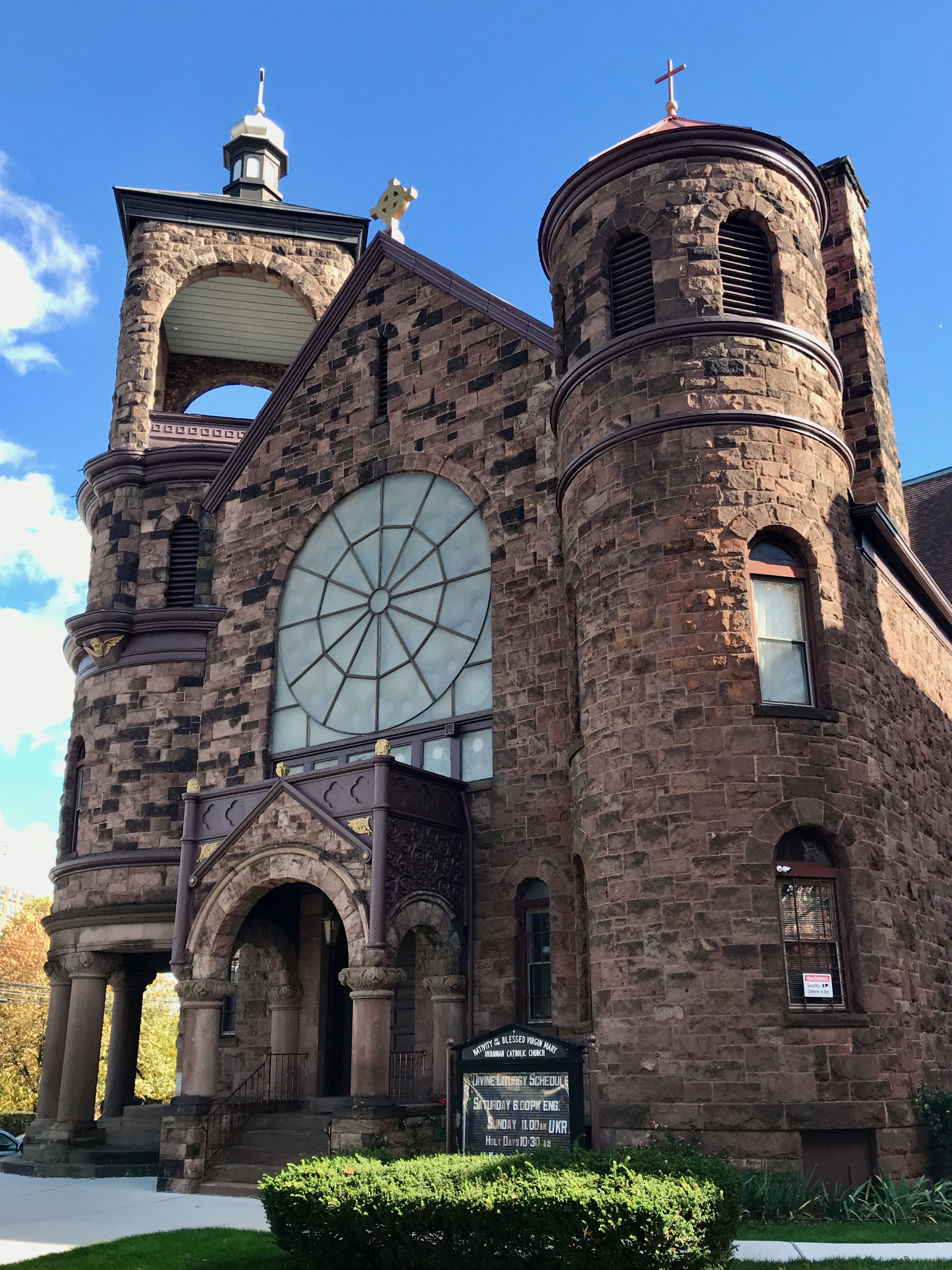
Ukrainian Catholic Church, Richardsonian Romanesque style

== See also ==
- William H. Johnson House
- Civic Square
- National Register of Historic Places listings in Middlesex County, New Jersey
- List of tallest buildings in New Brunswick
