= New Brunswick Main Post Office =

- Main Post Office
- U.S. National Register of Historic Places
- New Jersey Register of Historic Places
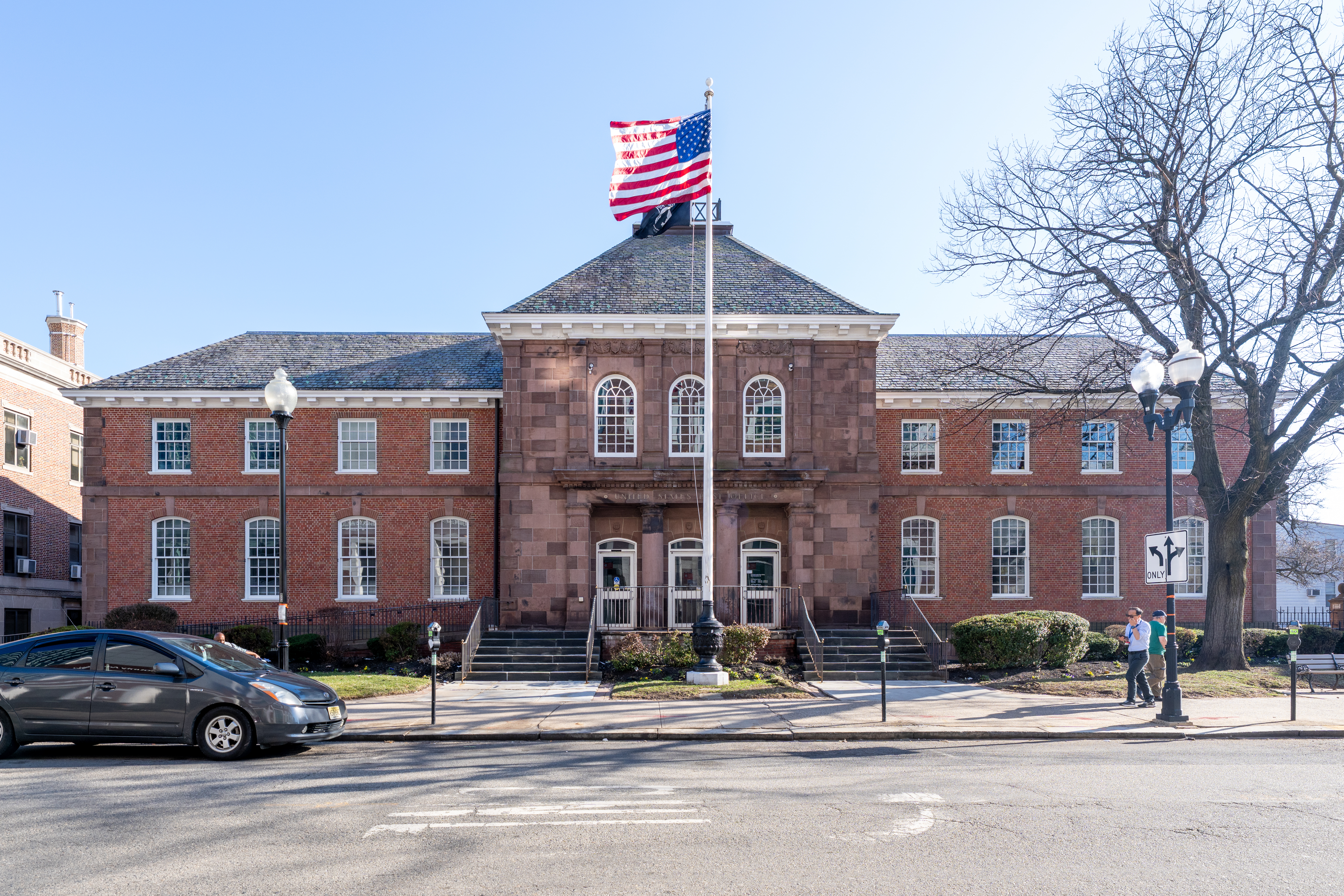
- The New Brunswick Main Post Office in 2026

- Location within Middlesex County, New Jersey Location within New Jersey Location within the United States
- Location: 86 Bayard Street, New Brunswick, New Jersey
- Coordinates: 40°29′36″N 74°26′47″W
- Built: 1934–1936
- Architect: Wesley Sherwood Bessell
- Architectural style: Neo-Georgian
- NRHP reference No.: 84002731
- NJRHP No.: 1870

Significant dates
- Added to NRHP: July 18, 1984
- Designated NJRHP: May 23, 1984

The Main Post Office in the city of New Brunswick in Middlesex County, New Jersey, United States was built between 1934 and 1936. Located in the Civic Square government district, it was designed in Neo-Georgian architecture by Wesley Sherwood Bessell. It was listed on the National Register of Historic Places on July 18, 1984, for its significance in architecture, art, and communications.

== History and description ==
This building replaced the previous post office located on Albany Street and built in 1903. The new building is built with red brick and brownstone and features Neo-Georgian architecture. The artist George Biddle created several murals depicting the American Revolutionary War in New Brunswick as part of the Works Progress Administration (WPA) Federal Arts Project. They were installed in 1939.

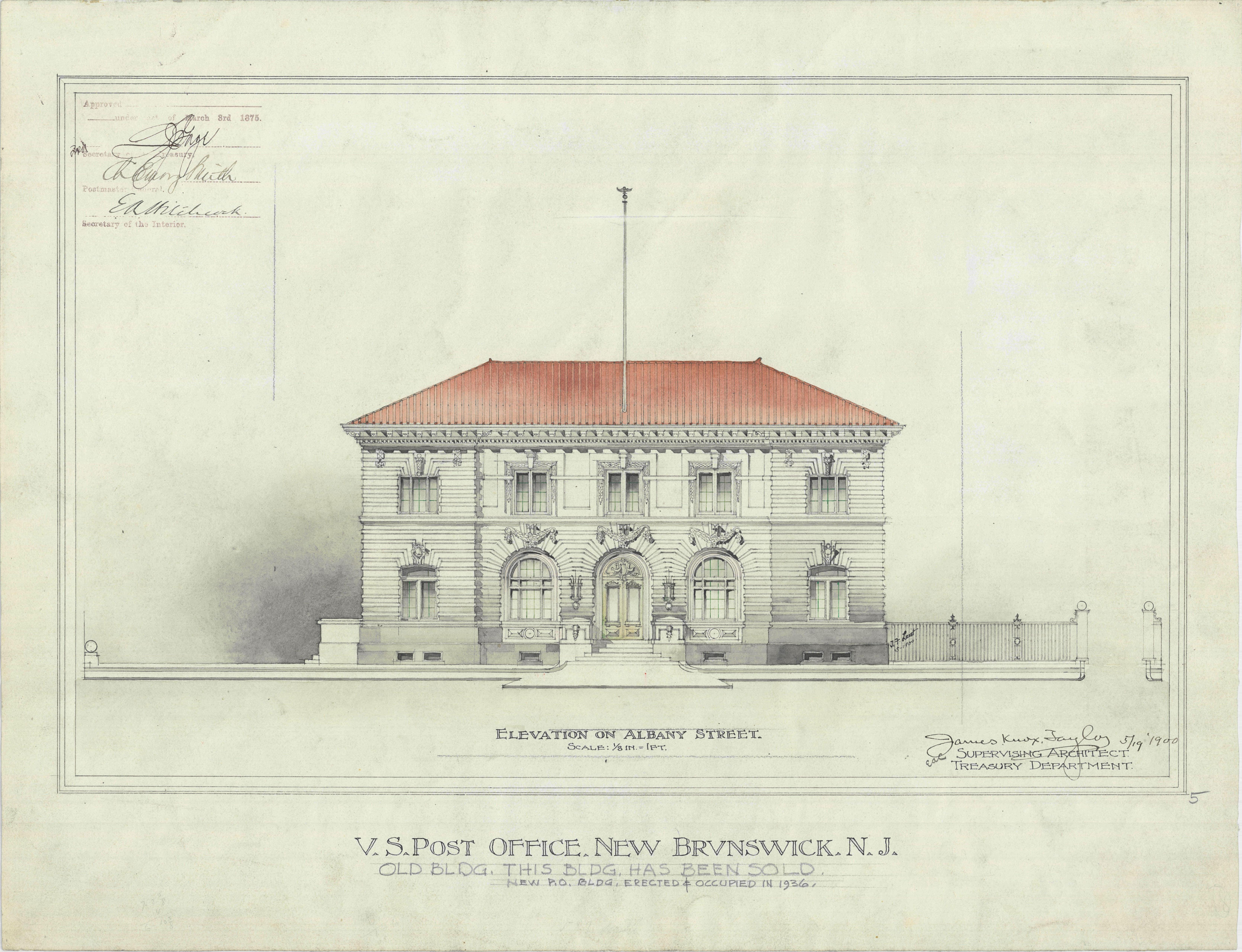
Previous post office on Albany Street
