= Nagornoye, Vologodsky District, Vologda Oblast =

Nagornoye Нагорное
- Village
- Location within Vologda Oblast Location within Russia
- Coordinates: 59°06′N 39°47′E
- Country: Russia
- Region: Vologda Oblast
- District: Vologodsky District
- Time zone: UTC+3:00

Nagornoye (Russian: Нагорное) is a rural locality (a village) in Spasskoye Rural Settlement, Vologodsky District, Vologda Oblast, Russia. The population was 7 as of 2002. There are 6 streets.

== Geography ==
Nagornoye is located 15 km southwest of Vologda (the district's administrative centre) by road. Mozhayskoye is the nearest rural locality.
