= Nagornoye, Vladimir Oblast =

Nagornoye Нагорное
- Village
- Location within Vladimir Oblast Location within Russia
- Coordinates: 56°05′N 40°54′E
- Country: Russia
- Region: Vladimir Oblast
- District: Sudogodsky District
- Time zone: UTC+3:00

Nagornoye (Russian: Нагорное) is a rural locality (a village) in Lavrovskoye Rural Settlement, Sudogodsky District, Vladimir Oblast, Russia. The population was 1 as of 2010.

== Geography ==
Nagornoye is located on the Sineborka River, 26 km north of Sudogda (the district's administrative centre) by road. Smykovo is the nearest rural locality.
