= Tetsu Nakamura =

Japanese physician (1946–2019)

- 中村 哲
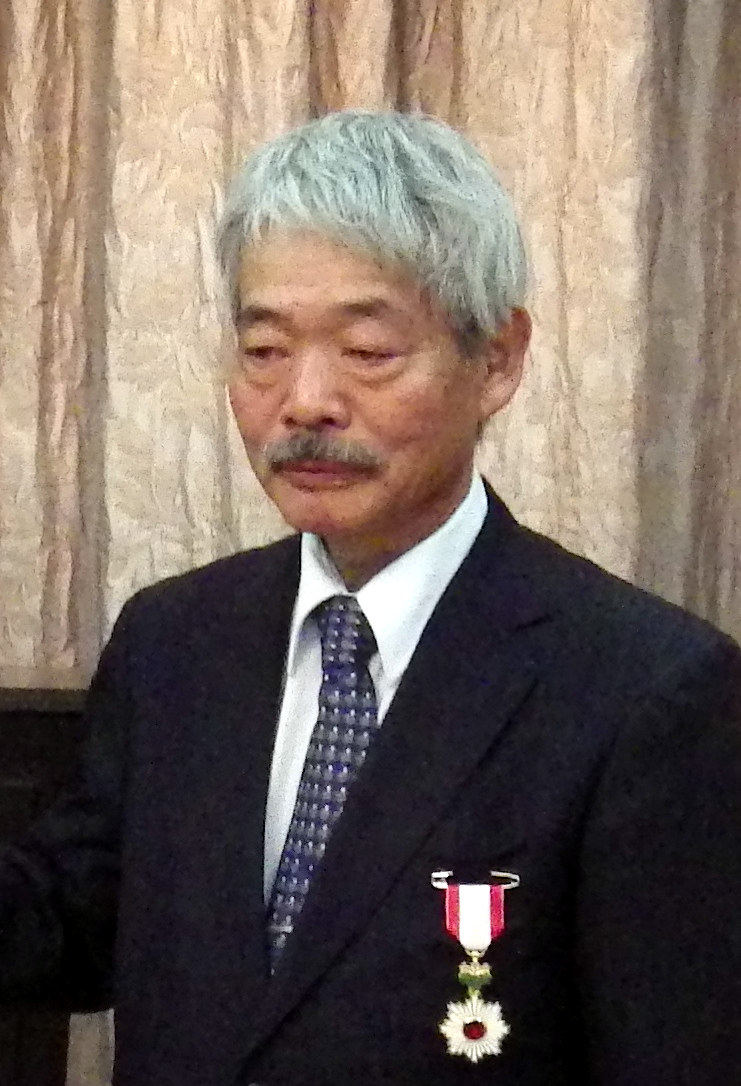
- Nakamura in 2016
- Born: 15 September 1946; Fukuoka, Japan
- Died: 4 December 2019 (aged 73); Jalalabad, Afghanistan
- Cause of death: Gunshot wound (assassination)
- Other names: Kaka Murad (Uncle Murad(کاکا مراد); Kaka Nakamura (Uncle Nakamura) (کاکا ناکامورا)
- Education: Kyushu University
- Occupation: Physician
- Spouse: Naoko Nakamura
- Relatives: Ashihei Hino (maternal uncle)
- Awards: Ramon Magsaysay Award (2003); Fukuoka Prize (2013); Kikuchi Kan Prize (2013); Order of the Rising Sun, Gold and Silver Rays (2016); Padma Shri (2020, posthumous)
- Website: drtetsunakamura.netlify.app

Tetsu Nakamura (中村 哲, Nakamura Tetsu; Pashto: تېتڅو ناکامورا), also known as Kaka Murad (Pashto: کاکا مراد, transl. "Uncle Nakamura"), (15 September 1946 – 4 December 2019), was a Japanese physician, humanitarian, and honorary Afghan citizen who headed Peace Japan Medical Services (PMS), an aid group known as Peshawar-kai in Japanese.

Nakamura was devoted to building canal projects, from the Kunar River in eastern Afghanistan and was credited with transforming the desert of Gamberi, on the outskirts of Jalalabad, into lush forest and productive wheat farmland. He also constructed two hospitals and two mosques. In October 2019, Afghan president Ashraf Ghani granted him honorary Afghan citizenship.

On 4 December 2019, as Nakamura was heading to work in his aid vehicle in Jalalabad, Afghanistan, he was assassinated by gunmen along with his bodyguards and driver. On 11 February 2021, sources in Afghanistan and Pakistan claimed that Amir Nawaz (also known as Haji Dubai) was the main suspect in Nakamura's death. Afghan and Pakistani officials claimed that Nawaz was killed in Afghanistan, and that he was a militant commander of the Tehrik-i-Taliban Pakistan, an anti-Pakistan militant group operating along the Afghan–Pakistani border.

== Early life and education ==
Nakamura was born in Fukuoka, a city in Fukuoka Prefecture on the northern shore of the Japanese island Kyushu. He spent his early childhood in Wakamatsu (in today's Kitakyushu), where both of his parents were born and raised.

Japanese novelist Ashihei Hino was Nakamura's uncle and worked for the Tamai Group (玉井組, Tamai Gumi), a stevedoring firm owned by Nakamura's maternal grandfather in Wakamatsu. Hino's novel Flowers and Dragons (花と龍, Hana to Ryuu) was adapted into film while Nakamura was in elementary school.

Having previously worked as a subcontractor for the Tamai Group, Nakamura's father launched his own business salvaging sunken ships after World War II.

Following the collapse of his father's business, Nakamura's family moved to Koga City, Fukuoka Prefecture, when he was age 6; he remained there through the rest of his formal education. In his youth, he studied at Koga Nishi Elementary School, Seinan Gakuin Junior High School, and Fukuoka Prefectural Fukuoka High School. Nakamura was baptized by a Christian missionary at the Kasumigaoka Baptist Church while attending junior high school. He graduated from Kyushu University School of Medicine in 1973.

== Career ==
Nakamura's first experience in the Afghanistan/Pakistan border region was in 1978, when he served as a medic for a Fukuoka Climbing Association mountaineering team during an expedition to climb Tirich Mir in western Pakistan. He was drawn there to pursue his love of mountain climbing and his hobby of collecting insects. At the request of Pakistan's Ministry of Tourism, Nakamura provided medical care to residents near the remote mountaineering base, which was located in the vicinity of Peshawar, Pakistan. Nakamura treated many patients suffering from tuberculosis and leprosy, which he attributed to malnutrition and poverty in the area.

With this experience in mind, he returned to Peshawar in 1984 as a volunteer with the Japan Overseas Christian Medical Cooperative Service at the Mission Hospital in Peshawar. He again treated patients with leprosy as well as Afghan refugees who were fleeing the Soviet–Afghan War. His wife and young children accompanied him and his children attended an American-funded international school. He initially intended to stay in Peshawar for five to six years.

Although the clinic was focused on leprosy, Nakamura saw that leprosy-prone areas had high incidence of other infectious diseases such as malaria, typhoid fever, dengue fever, and tuberculosis. In order to provide treatment for patients suffering from other diseases, he began to offer his own medical services independent of the Mission Hospital. In the mid-1990s, the World Health Organization began providing multi drug therapy (MDT) treatment free of cost to leprosy patients in a program originally funded by the Nippon Foundation. While international attention and aid to fight leprosy grew, Nakamura observed the number of Afghan patients with other infectious diseases continuing to increase without similar assistance, prompting him to establish a new hospital and expand his efforts.

Beginning in 1991, Nakamura opened three clinics to provide medical service in Nangarhar Province, Afghanistan, where he identified malnutrition as a root cause for the health issues in the region. From then onwards, he broadened the scope of his work into agriculture and irrigation, and focused on building canal projects in eastern Afghanistan.

Starting from 2000, a drought hit the region. A consequence of this drought was the multiplications of diseases due to malnutrition and lack of water. Nakamura stated about this situation: "One irrigation canal will do more good than 100 doctors." He also said: "A hospital treats patients one by one, but this helps an entire village. I love seeing a village that's been brought back to life." Starting from 2003, Nakamura started building an irrigation canal in the Khewa District (Kuz Kunar) of Nangarhar Province, the Marwarid Canal. The canal gets water from the Kunar River, and has a length of 25.5 km. He drew inspiration from the irrigation canals that had been built in his native Fukuoka more than 200 years ago, without the aid of modern equipment.

Nakamura built or restored eight additional canals, irrigating 16,000 hectares and supporting the livelihood of 600,000 people in the Gamberi desert on the outskirts of Jalalabad in Nangarhar Province. He also built eleven dams on the Kunar River. He declared: "Weapons and tanks don't solve problems. The revival of farming is the cornerstone of Afghanistan's recovery."

In Afghanistan, Nakamura risked his life several times. He once narrowly escaped machine-gun fire from a U.S. military helicopter. On another occasion, he rushed to protect levees from a dangerously overflowing river. "I would be happy to die here", he said.

== Death ==
Nakamura was fatally shot in a targeted killing on 4 December 2019 in Jalalabad, Afghanistan. The attackers also killed five others, including his bodyguards and driver. Police said that Nakamura, while sitting in the front passenger seat, was shot with five bullets at close range from above. According to a doctor performing the autopsy, the bullet entered Nakamura's right chest and lodged near the pelvis.

Of the seven to eight assailants, three were armed with fully automatic rifles and other firearms. The assailants were wearing traditional Afghan dress but did not cover their faces. According to an eyewitness: "The armed men drove to a restaurant near the site of the attack in two separate cars. When the vehicle carrying Nakamura approached, the attackers ran up and shot at it from both sides, killing Nakamura's bodyguard first." As one of the gunmen yelled at the witness to stay away from the scene, the witness hid at the restaurant. "When the sound of gunshots subsided, I heard voices trying to determine whether Nakamura and the others were all dead, before a few more shots were fired. 'It's finished, let's go', I heard one of the men say before they fled in their cars", the witness added.

Nakamura remained conscious after the attack and received treatment at a local hospital in Jalalabad, but bled to death at Jalalabad Airport as he was being prepared to be airlifted to a hospital at Bagram Airfield, a U.S. military base located 50 kilometres (30 mi) north of Kabul.

The security camera footage did not capture the actual shooting, but did show the two vehicles used by the assailants. Afghan security officials arrested two men in connection with the license plates of the vehicles identified in the footage.

=== Funeral procession ===
On 7 December, a state funeral ceremony was held for Nakamura at Kabul's Hamid Karzai International Airport, during which the Afghan President Ashraf Ghani joined soldiers to carry the coffin wrapped in the Afghan flag towards an airplane. Nakamura's wife, Naoko, and eldest daughter, Akiko, were present at the ceremony in Kabul. President Ghani said: "[Nakamura's] killers will definitely go to hell. The Afghan National Defense and Security Forces will find out the perpetrators and will hand them over to justice".

On 8 December, the airplane carrying Nakamura's body reached Tokyo's Narita International Airport. Nakamura's wife and eldest daughter, as well as the Japanese Senior Vice Foreign Minister Keisuke Suzuki, laid flowers and observed a moment of silence as the body was unloaded from the airplane in Tokyo.

On 11 December, a funeral was held for Nakamura in his hometown Fukuoka, attended by 1,300 mourners. The Afghan flag was laid over the coffin of Nakamura. Portraits of the other five Afghans killed with him were also displayed.

=== Responsibility ===
Afghan officials and civil society activists blamed the Taliban insurgent group for the attack. One of Nakamura's Japanese colleagues, Kazuya Ito, who was an agricultural specialist working on the construction of irrigation channels in the Kuz Kunar District of Afghanistan's Nangarhar Province, had previously been abducted and killed by the Taliban militants in 2008 as he was on his way to an irrigation project's site in the area. The Taliban, however, denied involvement in Nakamura's assassination. The Taliban claimed that they had good relations with organisations that contribute to the reconstruction of Afghanistan.

Provincial authorities in Nangarhar had obtained information about a possible attack on Nakamura about a year before the attack. According to the governor of Nangarhar province, Shah Mahmood Miakhel, Nakamura was cautioned by the provincial government about a plan to abduct or kill him six weeks before the attack. A few days before the attack, another warning was issued to him by the province's security authorities. Although Nakamura did not like being accompanied by security guards, the governor convinced him to the dispatch of four security guards in a separate vehicle for his protection.

=== Reactions ===
Nakamura's murder sent "shocks of grief" across Afghanistan and Japan, and drew widespread condemnation.

In Kabul, Nangarhar, Khost and Parwan provinces, as well as in New York and Delhi, candlelight vigils were held for Nakamura.

In Tokyo, tributes were paid to Nakamura at music concerts.

==== Afghan government ====
The Afghan President, Ashraf Ghani, offered his "deepest condolences" to the families of Nakamura and others who were killed in the attack, and called Nakamura's death a big loss to the people of Afghanistan. Ashraf Ghani's spokesman, Sediq Sediqqi, said: "Dr Nakamura dedicated all his life to change the lives of Afghans, working on water management, dams and improving traditional agriculture." The governor of Nangarhar province, Shah Mahmood Miakhel, said: "All the people of Nangarhar were saddened by Dr Nakamura's death and were thankful for the many years he spent helping the people."

In January 2021, Afghan Post issued a commemorative postage stamp of 300 AFN featuring the image of Nakamura.

==== Japanese government ====
The Japanese Prime Minister, Shinzō Abe, expressed "shock" over the assassination of Nakamura. He said: "[Nakamura] risked his life in a dangerous environment to do various work, and the people of Afghanistan were very grateful to him." Japanese Empress Masako, in a statement released by the Imperial Household Agency, mourned for the death of Nakamura.

==== Peshawar-kai ====
Masaru Murakami, Chairman of Nakamura's aid group Peshawar-kai, said he would continue all the work Nakamura had undertaken. "Nakamura told me how unreasonable it was that we don't offer help to poor people living in mountainous areas who die of treatable diseases," he added. Murakami succeeded Nakamura as the representative of Peshawar-kai in Afghanistan and decided to go to Afghanistan to resume the aid group's projects in the country.

==== UNAMA ====
The United Nations Assistance Mission in Afghanistan (UNAMA) tweeted: "UN in Afghanistan condemns and expresses its revulsion at the killing today of respected Japanese aid worker Dr. Tetsu Nakamura in Jalalabad. A senseless act of violence against a man who dedicated much of his life to helping the most vulnerable Afghans."

== Memorials ==
There was a mural dedicated to Nakamura in Kabul that was erased in 2021, at the direction of the new Taliban government.

On October 2022 a plaza commemorating Nakamura opened in Jalalabad, Nangarhar province.

Japanese shonen manga artist Gege Akutami created manga series Jujutsu Kaisen Modulo after being inspired by Nakamura's book, Providence Was with Us.

== Awards and decorations ==
- In 2003, he received the Philippines' Ramon Magsaysay Award—often called Asia's Nobel Prize—for peace and international understanding.
- Fukuoka Prize (Grand Prize) in 2013.
- Kikuchi Kan Prize from the Society for the Promotion of Japanese Literature in 2013.
- In 2016, he was inducted into the Earth Hall of Fame in Kyoto.
- Order of the Rising Sun (Gold and Silver Rays) in 2016.
- The Afghan national medal in 2018.
- On 7 October 2019, he was awarded honorary citizenship of Afghanistan for his long-standing services in the country.
- Padma Shri - 4th highest civilian award of India, was given to him posthumously on 26 January 2020.
- In August 2020, researchers from Saga University in Japan named a newly discovered species of gall midge insect Massalongia nakamuratetsui in honor of Nakamura.

== Publications ==
- Peshawaru nite: Katai soshite Afugan nanmin. Fukuoka: Sekifusha. 1989.
- Peshawaru kara no hokoku: Genchi iryo genjo de kangaeru. Tokyo: Kawai Booklet. 1990.
- Ten, tomo ni ari: Afghanistan sanjunen no tatakai. Tokyo: NHK Shuppan. 2013.
- Providence Was with Us: How a Japanese Doctor Turned the Afghan Desert Green (First English ed.). Tokyo: Japan Publishing Industry Foundation for Culture. 2020. ISBN 978-4-86658-147-7.
