= Nagorny, Petushinsky District, Vladimir Oblast =

Nagorny Нагорный
- Settlement
- Location within Vladimir Oblast Location within Russia
- Coordinates: 55°55′N 39°12′E
- Country: Russia
- Region: Vladimir Oblast
- District: Petushinsky District
- Time zone: UTC+3:00

Nagorny (Russian: Нагорный) is a rural locality (a settlement) and the administrative center of Nagornoye Rural Settlement, Petushinsky District, Vladimir Oblast, Russia. The population was 807 as of 2010. There are 12 streets.

== Geography ==
Nagorny is located 17 km west of Petushki (the district's administrative centre) by road. Pokrov is the nearest rural locality.
