= Atsuhito Nakata =

- 中田 厚仁
- Born: January 10, 1968; Osaka, Japan
- Died: April 8, 1993 (aged 25); Prasat Sambour District, Kampong Thom province, Cambodia
- Cause of death: Gunshot wound
- Education: Osaka University
- Occupation: UN volunteer

Atsuhito Nakata (中田 厚仁, Nakata Atsuhito; January 10, 1968 – April 8, 1993) was a Japanese UN Volunteer working as a District Electoral Supervisor with the United Nations who was gunned down in Kampong Thom, Cambodia along with his friend and interpreter Lek Sopheip.

As a United Nations Volunteer, Nakata traveled to Cambodia to help organize the first national elections at the community level in Cambodia after the reign of the Khmer Rouge. Nakata was one of 465 UNV District Election Volunteer Election Supervisors deployed with the United Nations Transitional Authority in Cambodia.
