= Nagorny, Zabaykalsky Krai =

Nagorny Нагорный
- Settlement
- Location within Zabaykalsky Krai Location within Russia
- Coordinates: 52°01′N 116°33′E
- Country: Russia
- Region: Zabaykalsky Krai
- District: Nerchinsky District
- Time zone: UTC+9:00

Nagorny (Russian: Нагорный) is a rural locality (a settlement) in Nerchinsky District, Zabaykalsky Krai, Russia. Population: 433 (2021 census); 489 (2010 census); 551 (2002 census); There are 4 streets in this settlement.

== Geography ==
This rural locality is located 5 km from Nerchinsk (the district's administrative centre), 210 km from Chita (capital of Zabaykalsky Krai) and 5,418 km from Moscow. Zarechny is the nearest rural locality.
