= Henry Guest House =

Historic house in New Jersey, United States

- U.S. National Register of Historic Places
- New Jersey Register of Historic Places
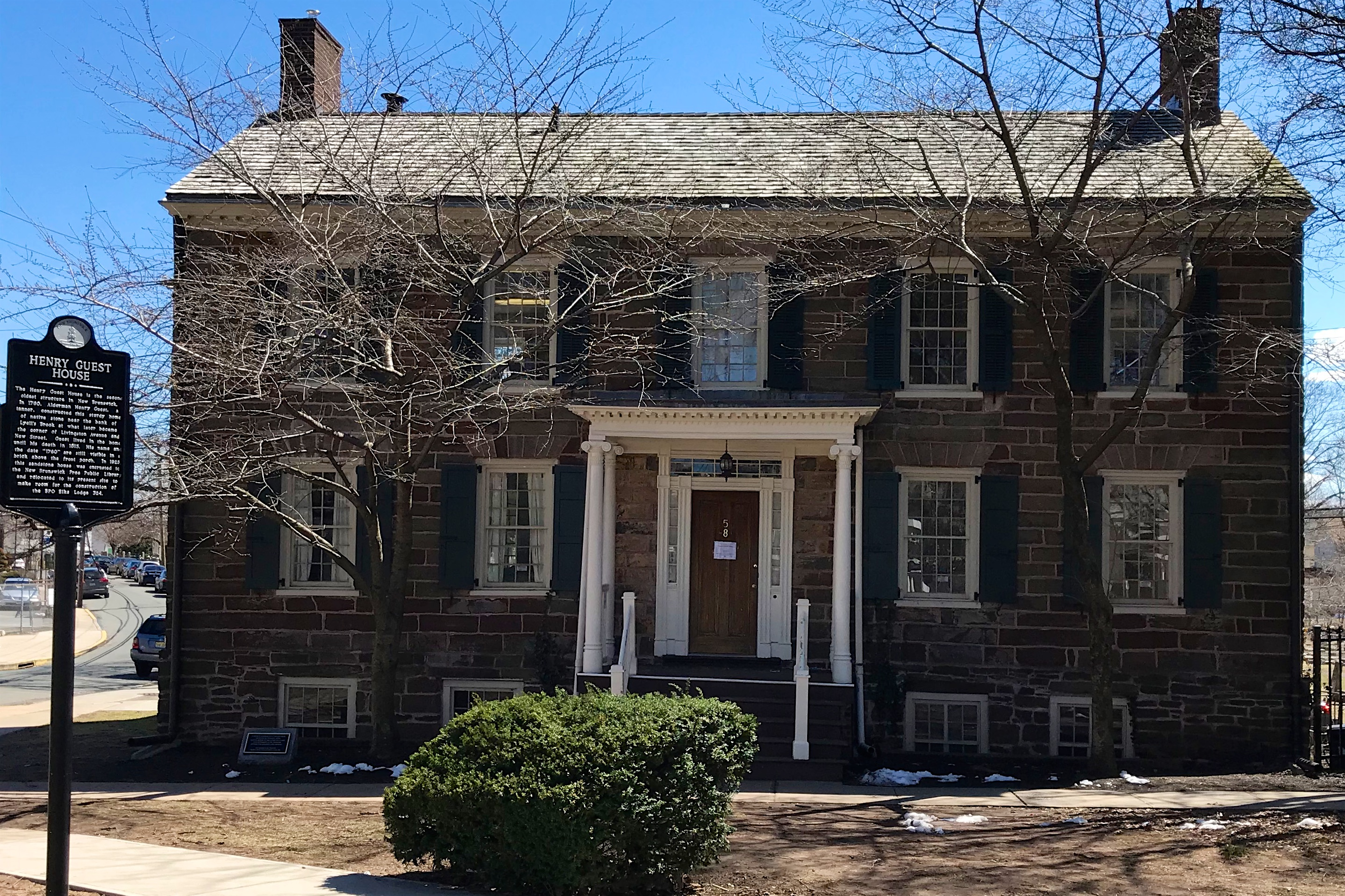
- The Henry Guest House, 2018

- Location within Middlesex County, New Jersey Location within New Jersey Location within the United States
- Location: 58 Livingston Avenue, New Brunswick, New Jersey
- Coordinates: 40°29′29″N 74°26′45″W
- Built: 1760
- Architect: Henry Guest, Sr.
- Architectural style: Colonial
- NRHP reference No.: 76001163
- NJRHP No.: 1863

Significant dates
- Added to NRHP: May 24, 1976
- Designated NJRHP: January 6, 1976

The Henry Guest House is in New Brunswick, Middlesex County, New Jersey, at Livingston Avenue and Morris Street. It was originally located on New Street (previously known as Carroll Place) between Livingston Avenue and George Street. The Georgian stone farmhouse was built in 1760 by Henry Guest. He was a New Brunswick alderman and an associate of John Adams and author Thomas Paine. It was added to the National Register of Historic Places on May 24, 1976.

Henry Guest, who operated a tannery, bought two and a half acres on the corner of Livingston Avenue and Carroll Place (New Street) in 1755. He built a sandstone house five years later and lived there with his family until his death in 1815. Henry Guest said, "If his descendants would only keep a roof on it, the house would stand till Gabriel blew his trumpet." In an 1817 sales advertisement the building was described as "one of the best stone houses in the State of New Jersey."

By the 20th century the house was threatened with demolition, and in 1924, it was moved up Livingston Avenue next to the New Brunswick Free Public Library. Over time, the roof and other parts of the building deteriorated. In 1992, the city and the New Jersey Historic Trust funded a major exterior renovation. A new roof, repointing of the mortar, and other repairs prevented further decay and today the Guest House is mostly used for meeting rooms.

== Gallery ==
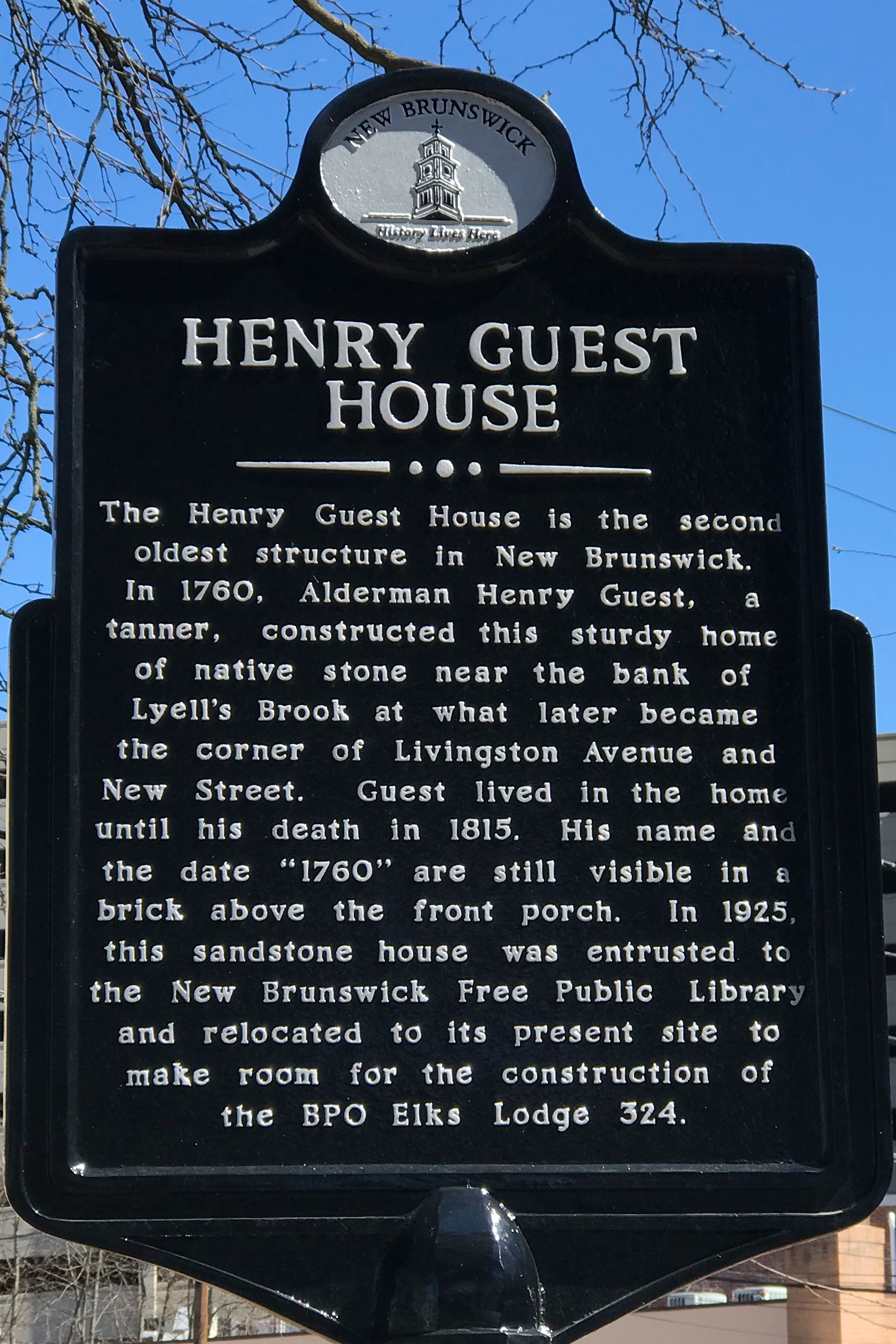
New Brunswick historical information

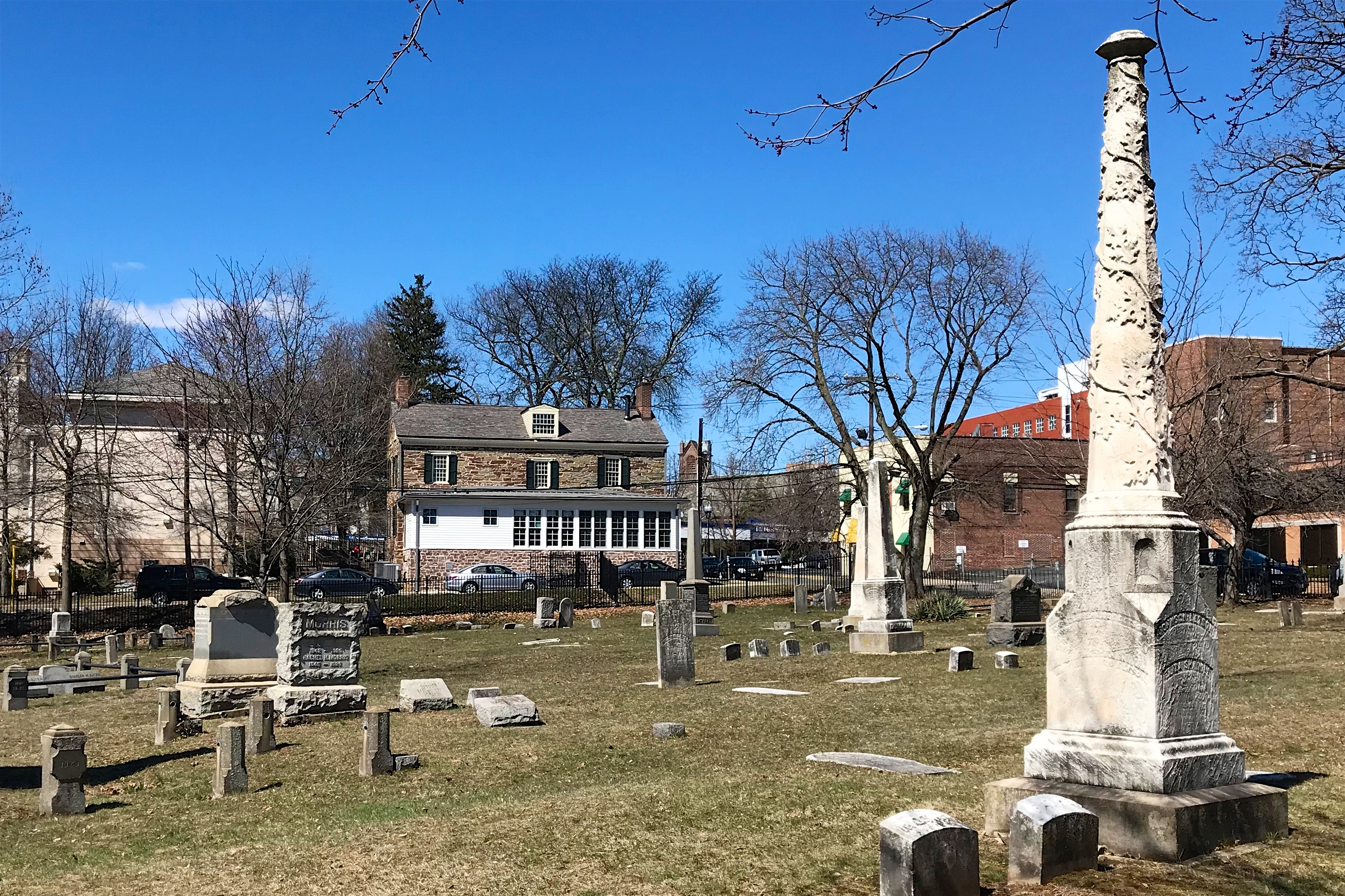
View from Willow Grove Cemetery, 2018

== See also ==
- Livingston Avenue Historic District
