= Nagorny, Fatezhsky District, Kursk Oblast =

Rural locality in Kursk Oblast, Russia

Nagorny Нагорный
- Khutor
- Interactive map of Nagorny
- Location of Nagorny Nagorny (Kursk Oblast)
- Coordinates: 52°04′27″N 35°40′59″E
- Country: Russia
- Federal subject: Kursk Oblast
- Administrative district: Fatezhsky District
- SelsovietSelsoviet: Soldatsky

Population (2010 Census)
  - Total: 7
  - Estimate (2010): 7 (0%)

Municipal status
  - Municipal district: Fatezhsky Municipal District
  - Rural settlement: Soldatsky Selsoviet Rural Settlement
- Time zone: UTC+3 (MSK)
- Postal code: 307106
- Dialing code: +7 47144
- OKTMO ID: 38644468121
- Website: мосолдатский.рф

Nagorny (Russian: Нагорный) is a rural locality (a khutor) in Soldatsky Selsoviet Rural Settlement, Fatezhsky District, Kursk Oblast, Russia. The population as of 2010 is 7.

== Geography ==
The khutor is located on the Usozha River (a left tributary of the Svapa in the basin of the Seym), 92 km from the Russia–Ukraine border, 51 km north-west of Kursk, 11 km west of the district center – the town Fatezh, 3.5 km from the selsoviet center – Soldatskoye.

=== Climate ===
Nagorny has a warm-summer humid continental climate (Dfb in the Köppen climate classification).

== Transport ==
Nagorny is located 9 km from the federal route M-2 Crimea Highway as part of the European route E105, 3 km from the road of regional importance 38K-038 (Fatezh – Dmitriyev), 2.5 km from the road of intermunicipal significance 38Н-679 (38K-038 – Soldatskoye – Shuklino), 25 km from the nearest railway halt 29 km (railway line Arbuzovo – Luzhki-Orlovskiye).

The rural locality is situated 54 km from Kursk Vostochny Airport, 169 km from Belgorod International Airport and 245 km from Voronezh Peter the Great Airport.
