= Gamberi =

Area on the outskirts of Jalalabad, Afghanistan

Gamberi (Pashto: جمبېرۍ) is an area on the outskirts of Jalalabad in Nangarhar Province, Afghanistan.

In the past, the area used to be a forest of indigenous bushes, but deforestation during the War in Afghanistan (since 1978) led to desertification and erosion of agricultural fields. In 2000, a drought hit the region which resulted in multiplications of diseases due to malnutrition and lack of water. In 2003, the Japanese-Afghan physician Tetsu Nakamura started building irrigation canals in the region. He drew inspiration from the irrigation canals that had been built in his native Fukuoka, southwest Japan, more than 200 years ago without the aid of modern equipment. Nakamura built or restored nine canals, irrigating 16,000 hectares and supporting the livelihood of 600,000 people. It turned the area into lush forests and productive wheat farmlands.
