= Nagorny, Gus-Khrustalny District, Vladimir Oblast =

Nagorny Нагорный
- Village
- Location within Vladimir Oblast Location within Russia
- Coordinates: 55°24′N 40°45′E
- Country: Russia
- Region: Vladimir Oblast
- District: Gus-Khrustalny District
- Time zone: UTC+3:00

Nagorny (Russian: Нагорный) is a rural locality (a village) in Krasnooktyabrskoye Rural Settlement, Gus-Khrustalny District, Vladimir Oblast, Russia. The population was 1 as of 2010.

== Geography ==
Nagorny is located on the Gus River, 34 km south of Gus-Khrustalny (the district's administrative centre) by road. Krasny Posyolok is the nearest rural locality.
