= Nagorny, Volgograd Oblast =

Nagorny Нагорный
- Settlement
- Location within Volgograd Oblast Location within Russia
- Coordinates: 50°18′N 45°37′E
- Country: Russia
- Region: Volgograd Oblast
- District: Kamyshinsky District
- Time zone: UTC+4:00

Nagorny (Russian: Нагорный) is a rural locality (a settlement) in Verkhnedobrinskoye Rural Settlement, Kamyshinsky District, Volgograd Oblast, Russia. The population was 174 as of 2010. There are 5 streets.

== Geography ==
Nagorny is located on the Volga Upland, 34 km northeast of Kamyshin (the district's administrative centre) by road. Nizhnyaya Dobrinka is the nearest rural locality.
