= Nagornoye, Voronezh Oblast =

Nagornoye Нагорное
- Khutor
- Location within Voronezh Oblast Location within Russia
- Coordinates: 50°09′N 39°35′E
- Country: Russia
- Region: Voronezh Oblast
- District: Rossoshansky District
- Time zone: UTC+3:00

Nagornoye (Russian: Нагорное) is a rural locality (a khutor) in Morozovskoye Rural Settlement, Rossoshansky District, Voronezh Oblast, Russia. The population was 137 as of 2010.

== Geography ==
Nagornoye is located 13 km south of Rossosh (the district's administrative centre) by road. Antselovich is the nearest rural locality.
