= Nagorny, Amur Oblast =

Nagorny Нагорный
- Settlement
- Location within Amur Oblast Location within Russia
- Coordinates: 50°24′N 128°58′E
- Country: Russia
- Region: Amur Oblast
- District: Oktyabrsky District
- Time zone: UTC+9:00

Nagorny (Russian: Нагорный) is a rural locality (a settlement) in Yekaterinoslavsky Selsoviet of Oktyabrsky District, Amur Oblast, Russia. The population was 33 as of 2018. There are 4 streets.

== Geography ==
Nagorny is located 13 km northwest of Yekaterinoslavka (the district's administrative centre) by road. Urozhaynoye is the nearest rural locality.
