= New Brunswick Free Public Library =

- U.S. Historic district – Contributing property
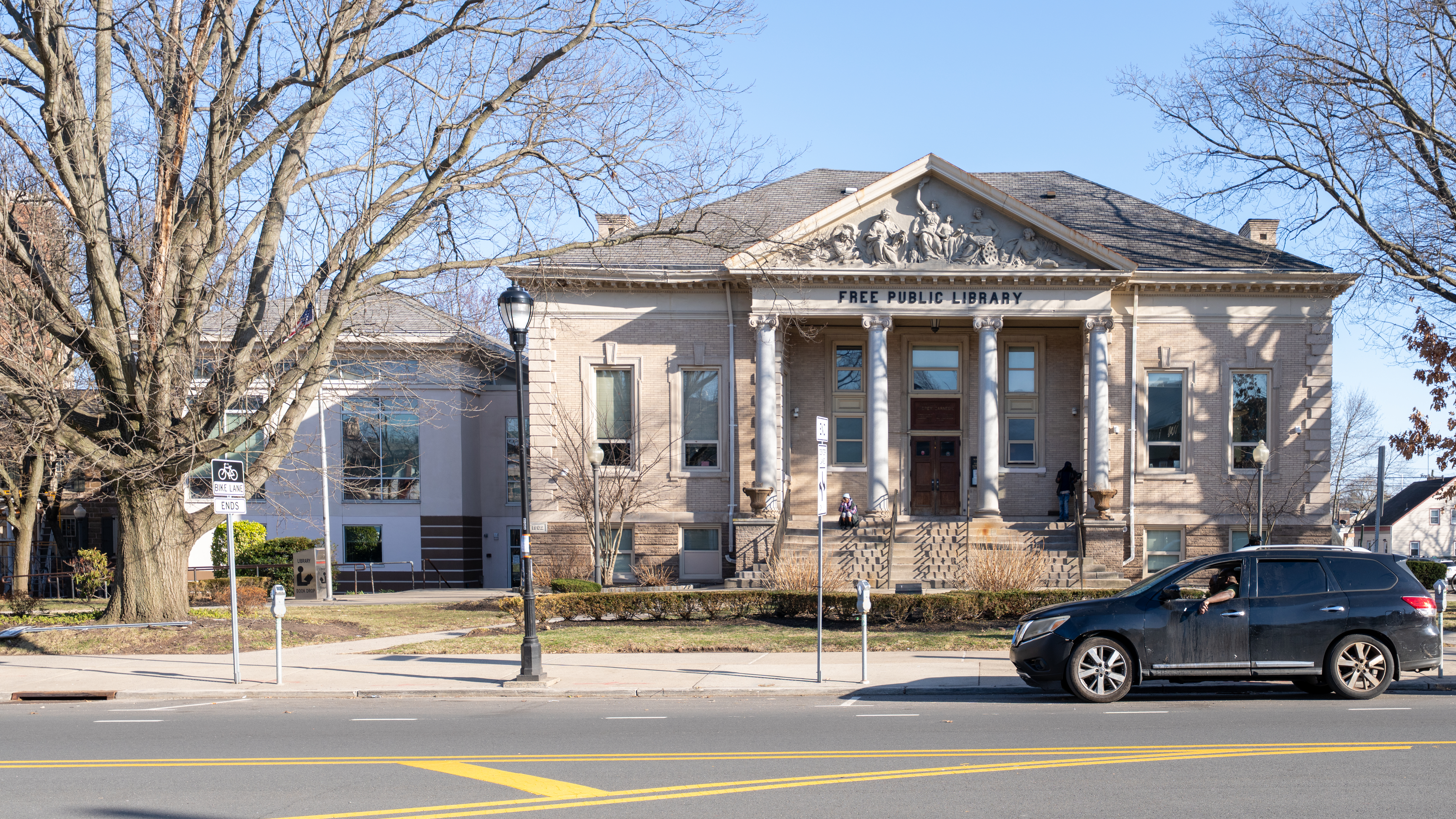
- Location: 60 Livingston Avenue, New Brunswick, New Jersey
- Coordinates: 40°29′29″N 74°26′45″W
- Built: 1903
- Architect: George K. Parsell
- Architectural style: Beaux Arts
- Part of: Livingston Avenue Historic District (ID96000072)
- Designated CP: February 16, 1996

The New Brunswick Free Public Library is the public library of New Brunswick, New Jersey. The main library, built 1903, is located at 60 Livingston Avenue and is one of New Jersey's Carnegie libraries. The Henry Guest House was moved to library grounds in 1924 and is bordered by the Willow Grove Cemetery. It is a contributing property of the Livingston Avenue Historic District. The library is the only building with Beaux Arts style in the district.The library serves as a community resource center, providing residents with access to digital literacy programs, English as a Second Language (ESL) classes, and local history archives.

== Gallery ==
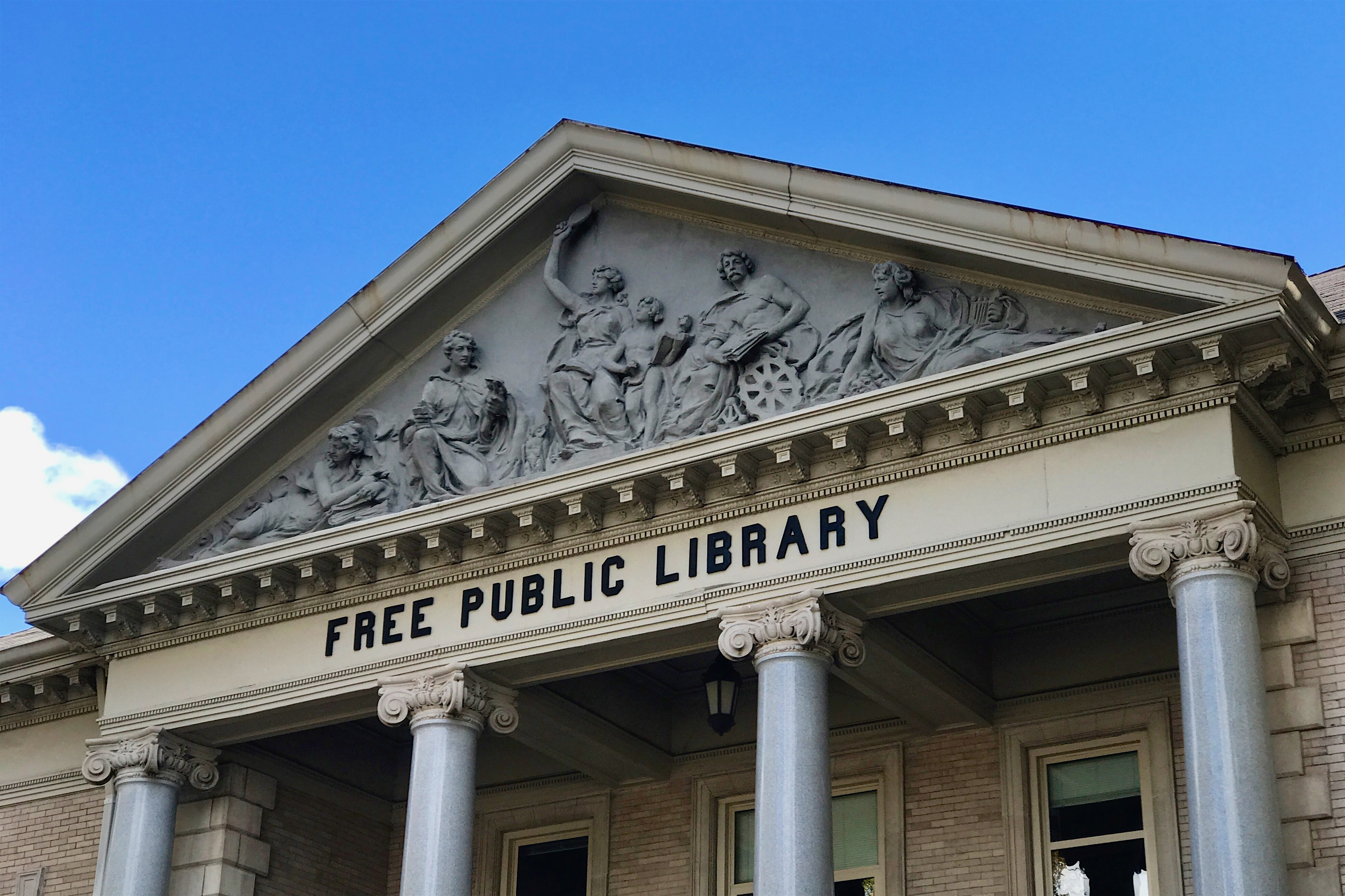
Sculptures in the pediment

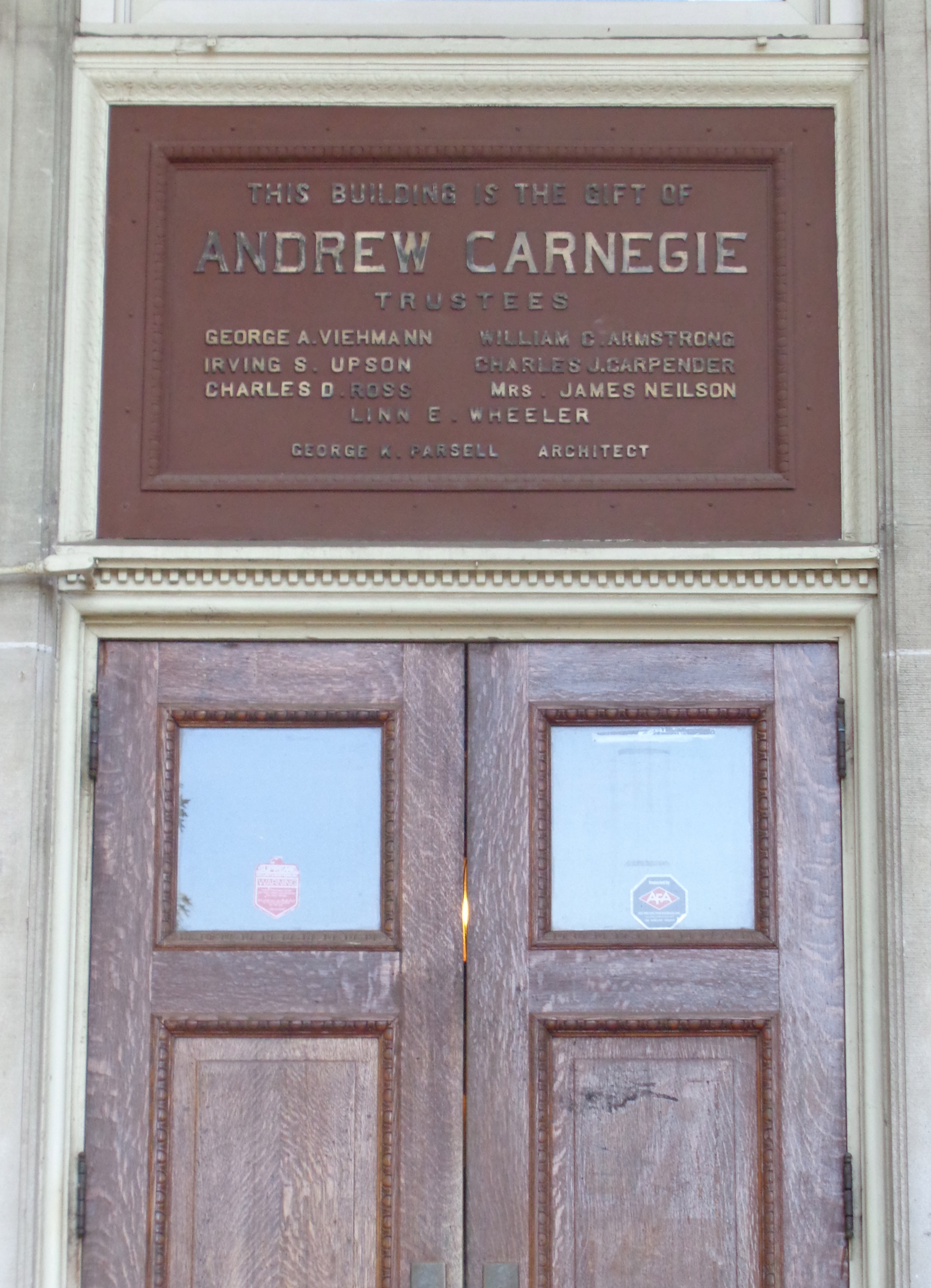
Entrance

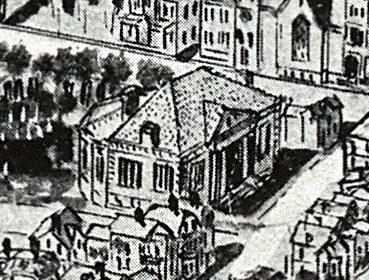
Site of the library in 1910

== See also ==
- List of Carnegie libraries in New Jersey
- National Register of Historic Places listings in Middlesex County, New Jersey
