= Willow Grove Cemetery, New Brunswick =

Historic cemetery in New Jersey

Coordinates: 40.4903°N 74.4447°W

Willow Grove Cemetery
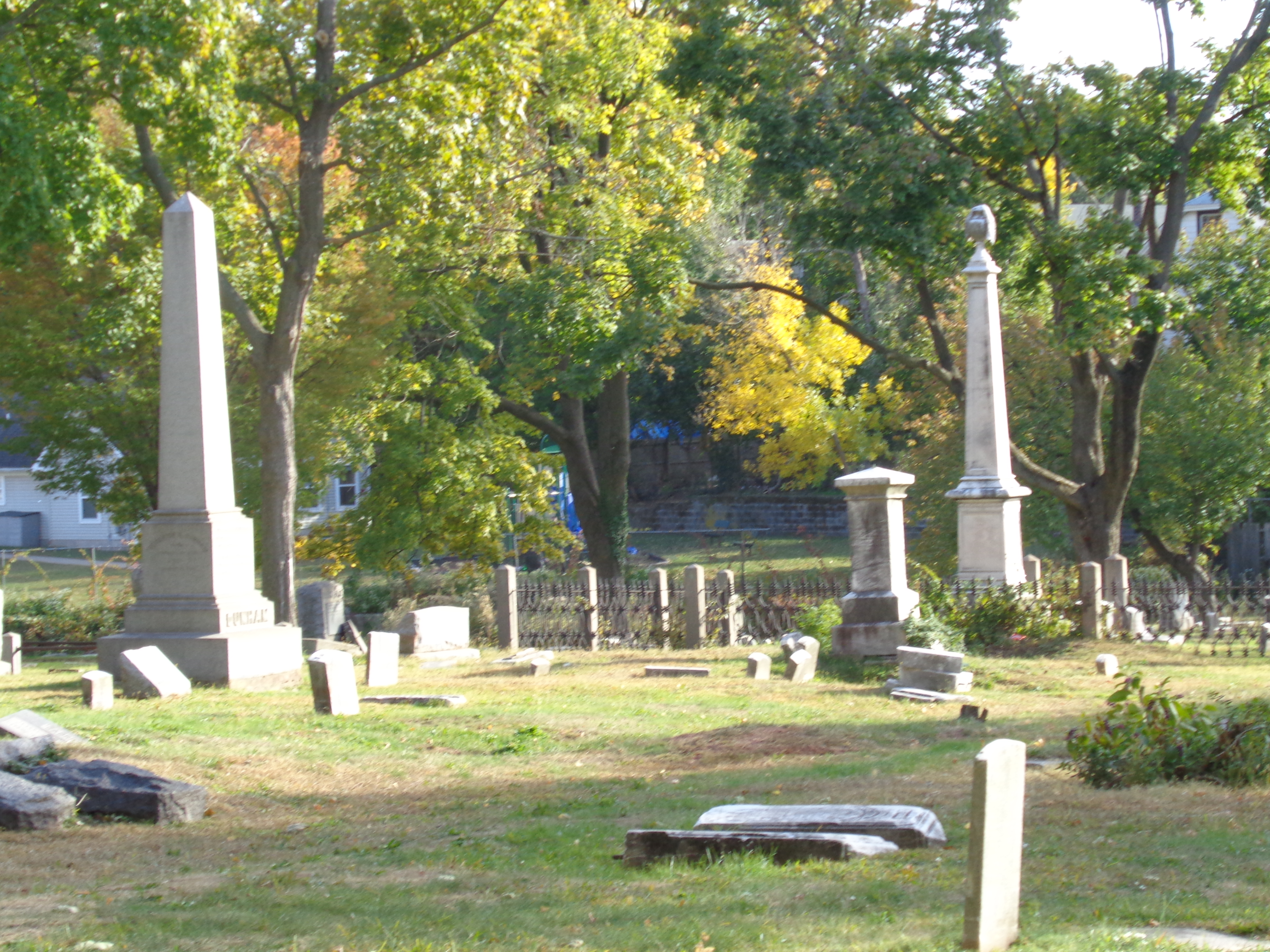
- Interactive map of Willow Grove Cemetery

Details
- Location: Morris Street, New Brunswick
- Find a Grave: Willow Grove Cemetery
- Willow Grove Cemetery
- U.S. Historic district – Contributing property
- Part of: Livingston Avenue Historic District (ID96000072)
- Designated CP: February 16, 1996

The Willow Grove Cemetery in New Brunswick, New Jersey is located behind the New Brunswick Free Public Library and the Henry Guest House. The cemetery runs along Morris Street, from Livingston Avenue to George Street. It is a contributing site of the Livingston Avenue Historic District.

The cemetery was originally a graveyard for Baptist and Presbyterian churches in the early 19th century. It is the burial place of several of the first Japanese exchange students to come to the United States, including Taro Kusakabe, a young samurai of Fukui and student of William Elliot Griffis, who studied at Rutgers University in the late 19th century and died there of tuberculosis.

Recently identified, New Brunswick Police Officer William I. Van Arsdale, died in the line of duty on December 7, 1856 at the age of 49 in a drowning in the Delaware Raritan Canal at the end of his shift. Officer Van Arsdale is the first known officer to die in the line of duty for the New Brunswick Police Department, New Jersey.

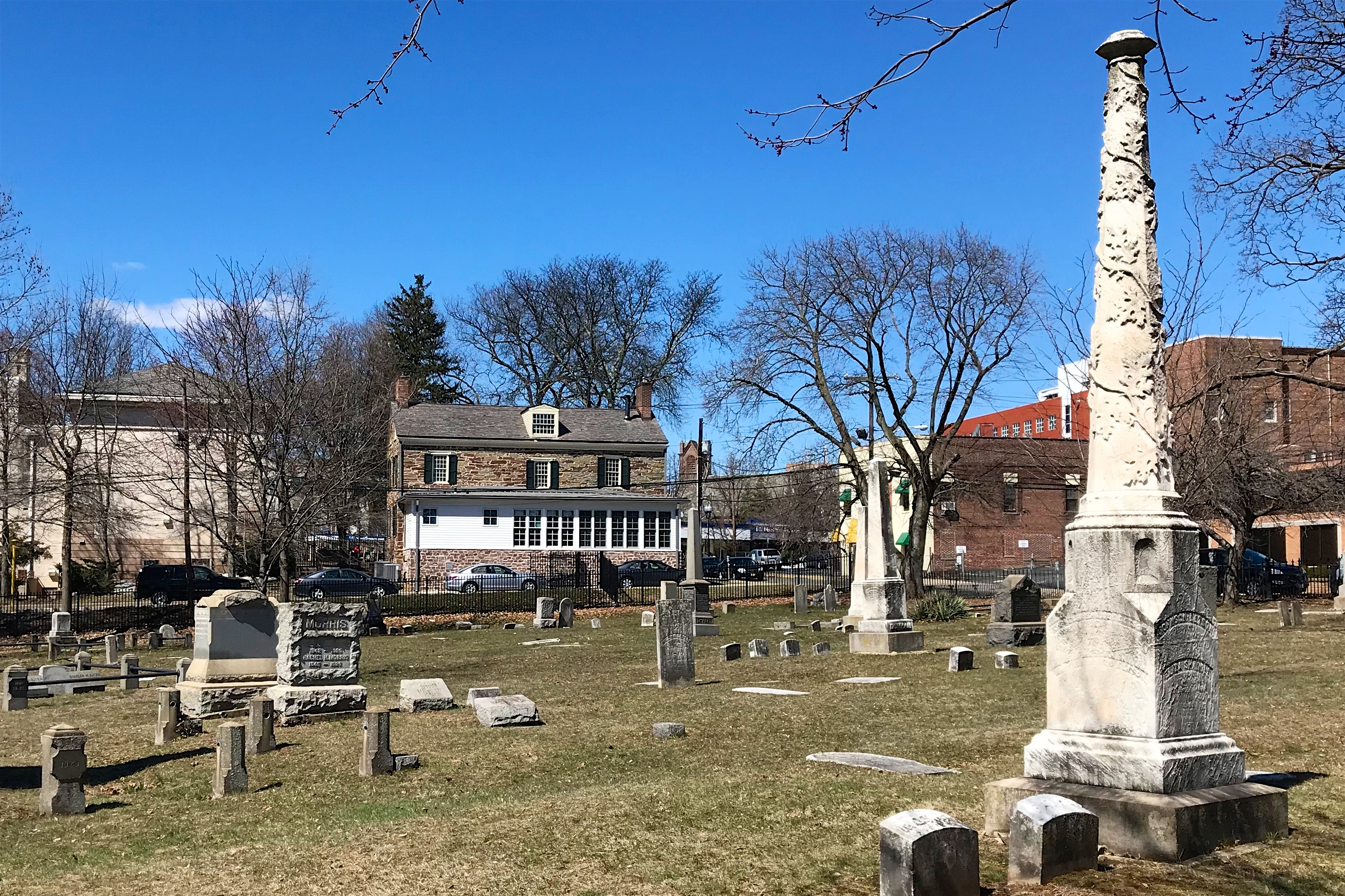
View of the Henry Guest House from the cemetery, 2018.

== Notable burials ==
- Taro Kusakabe (ja:日下部太郎) (1845–1870), samurai, Rutgers student
- John Munroe (1796–1861), military Governor of New Mexico
