= Padi Boyd =

American astrophysicist

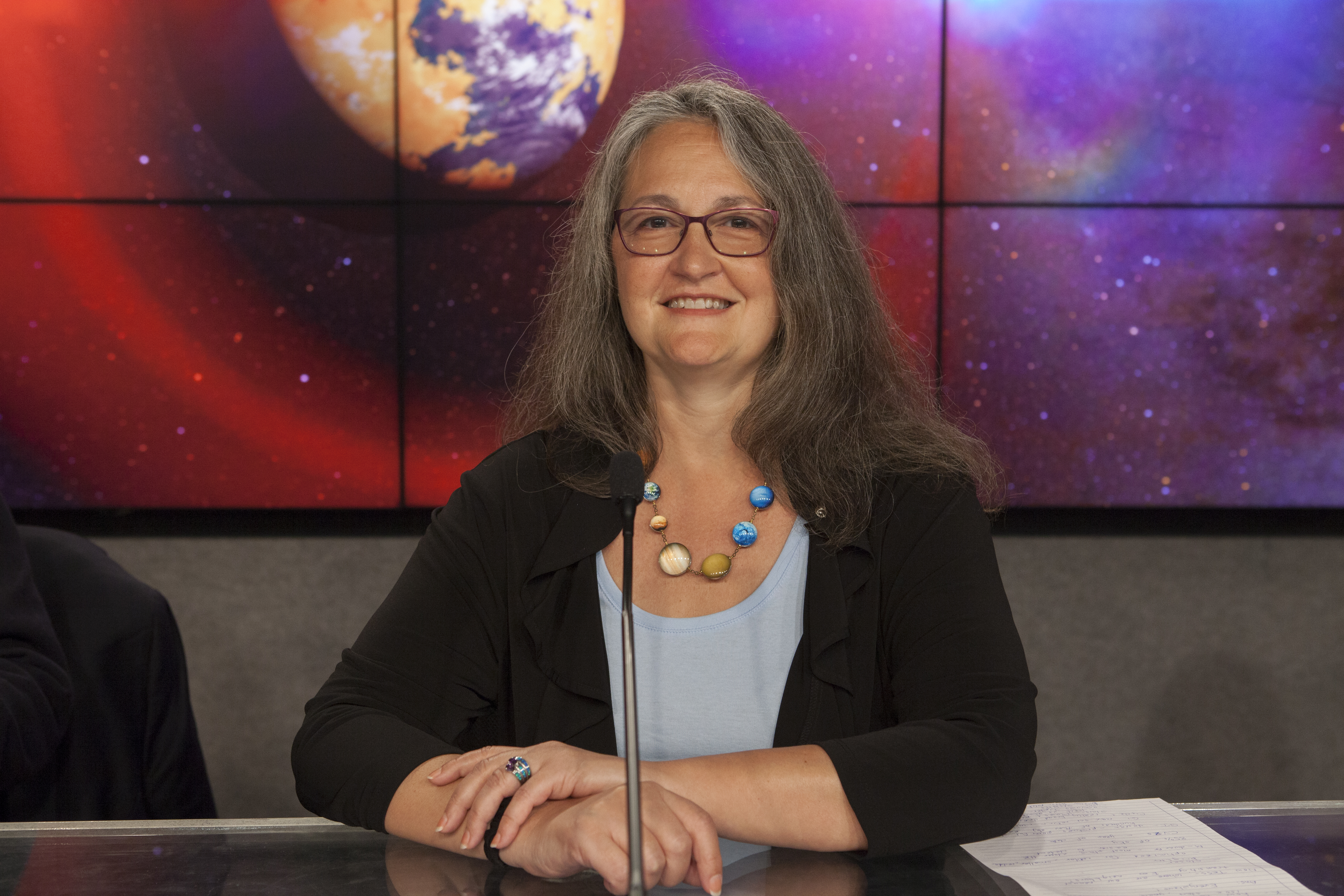
- Boyd at a briefing in the Press Site auditorium at Kennedy Space Center in Florida
- Other name: Patricia T. Boyd
- Education: Drexel University, Ph.D.
- Scientific career
- Fields: Astrophysics
- Workplaces: NASA
- Thesis: Chaotic Scattering in the Gravitational Three-body Problem (1993)

Padi Boyd is an American astrophysicist. She is the head of NASA's Exoplanets and Stellar Astrophysics Laboratory and an Associate Director at the Goddard Space Flight Center. She is the project scientist for NASA's Transiting Exoplanet Survey Satellite (TESS) mission.

== Early life and education ==
Boyd was born in Perth Amboy, New Jersey. She was more interested in the arts than in science as a child, but became interested in astronomy in high school, spurred in part by Carl Sagan's Cosmos television show. Raised in Metuchen, New Jersey, she graduated from Metuchen High School and was inducted in 2015 into the school's hall of fame as part of its inaugural class. She began conducted astronomical research as an undergraduate at Villanova University, and went on to pursue graduate studies as Drexel University, where she earned a Ph.D. in physics and atmospheric science in 1993.

== Career ==
In 1993, Boyd began work for NASA at the Goddard Space Flight Center, working with the Hubble Space Telescope's High Speed Photometer Team. In 1995, she joined Goddard's X-Ray Astronomy Group, where she worked on the MOXE x-ray telescope; in 1997 she began work on the Rossi X-ray Timing Explorer. From 2003 to 2008, she managed both the Rossi facility and the Swift Science Center. She went on to work on the Kepler space telescope and its successor, the Transiting Exoplanet Survey Satellite (TESS) mission.

== Musical project ==
Boyd is a member of the Chromatics, an a cappella group focused on songs about astronomy and physics. Members of the group include engineers, astronomers, and other employees from NASA. In May 1998, with the support of a NASA Initiative to Develop Education through Astronomy (IDEA) grant, the group released a 6-track CD AstroCappella along with a packet of related educational materials for use by classroom teachers. They released an expanded CD, AstroCappella 2.0 in 2001, with additional teaching resources on CD-ROM. They have performed at the National Air and Space Museum, the Maryland Science Center, and in Honolulu, Las Vegas, and Orlando, Florida, among other venues.
