= Jim Fielding =

American sprinter

Jim Fielding was a high school track champion and record holder in the late 1940s.

Fielding was a standout sprinter for Metuchen High School in Metuchen, New Jersey. Fielding's speed was such that the Metuchen athletic director steered him toward track, not wanting him to get hurt playing football. He soon became a statewide success and was followed by the state's largest newspaper, the Newark Star Ledger. Fielding ran the 40 yard dash in 4.2 seconds, a United States schoolboy record at the time, the 100 yard dash in a wind-assisted 9.2 seconds, and the 220 yard sprint in under 21 seconds.

Fielding attended Georgetown University. He died while still a student at Georgetown.
