= Middlesex Avenue–Woodwild Park Historic District =

Historic district in New Jersey, United States

- U.S. National Register of Historic Places
- U.S. Historic district
- New Jersey Register of Historic Places
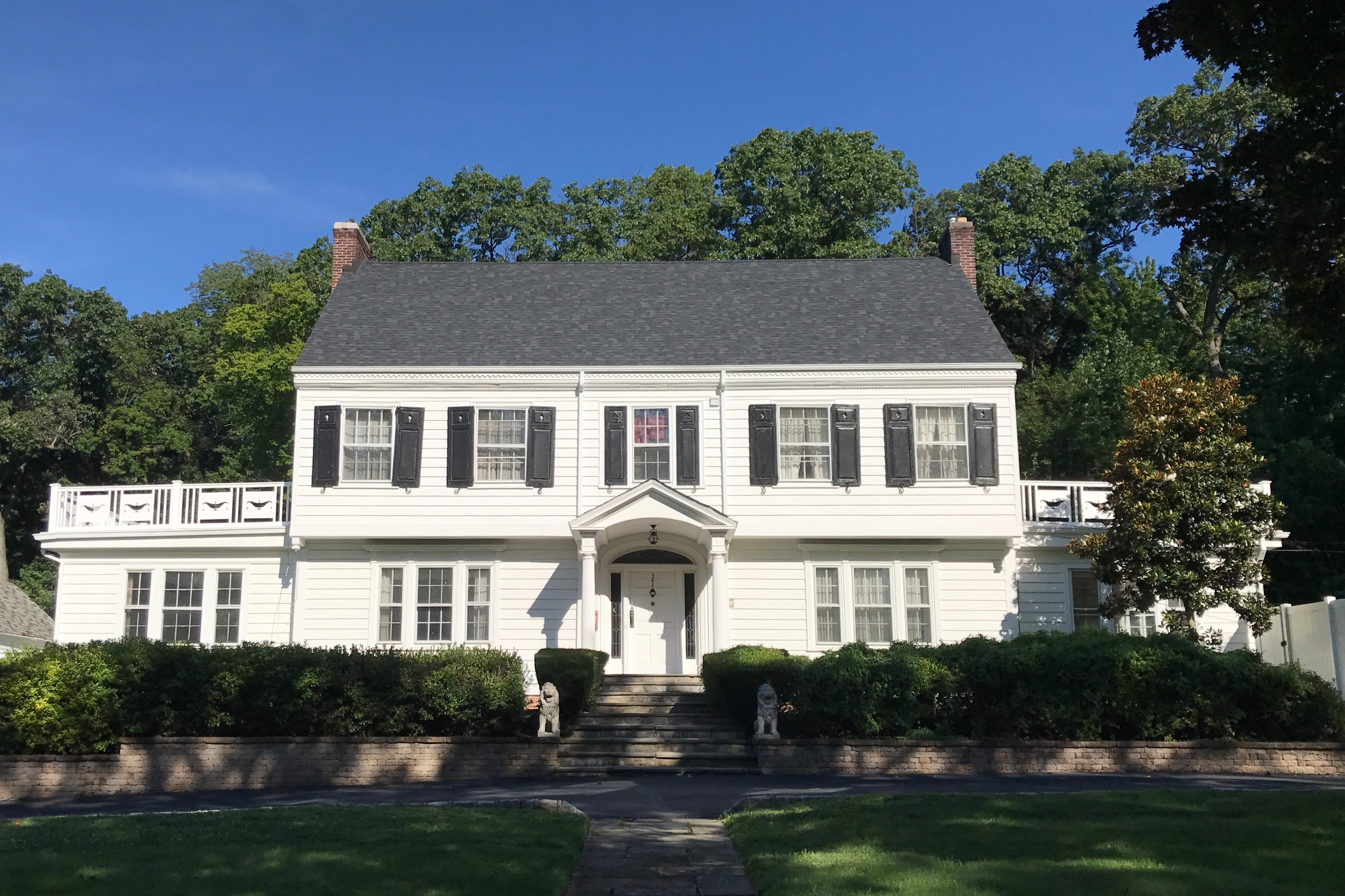
- 344 Middlesex Avenue, the Applegate House

- Location within Middlesex County, New Jersey Location within New Jersey Location within the United States
- Location: Middlesex Avenue and surrounding streets Metuchen, New Jersey
- Coordinates: 40°32′47″N 74°21′32″W
- Area: 89 acres (36 ha)
- Architectural style: Colonial Revival, Tudor Revival, Mission, Bungalow/Craftsman, Gothic, Queen Anne, Italianate, Greek Revival
- NRHP reference No.: 100001396
- NJRHP No.: 5349

Significant dates
- Added to NRHP: July 31, 2017
- Designated NJRHP: June 5, 2017

The Middlesex Avenue–Woodwild Park Historic District is an 89-acre (36 ha) historic district located in the borough of Metuchen in Middlesex County, New Jersey, United States. The district was added to the National Register of Historic Places on July 31, 2017, for its significance in architecture, social history, community planning and development. It includes 201 contributing buildings, five contributing objects, and one contributing site. The Borough Improvement League House, also known as the Old Franklin Schoolhouse, was documented by the Historic American Buildings Survey (HABS) in 1936, and St. Luke's Episcopal Church in 1960.

== Gallery of contributing properties ==
Selected properties that are key, that is, the most important to the district in terms of architecture or history, as described by the nomination form. The Corbin House was built around 1910 with Colonial Revival architecture. The Metuchen Public Library, built 1937, is another Colonial Revival building. The Old Franklin Schoolhouse was built around 1807 with Greek Revival architecture. St. Luke's Episcopal Church was completed in 1869 with Carpenter Gothic architecture.

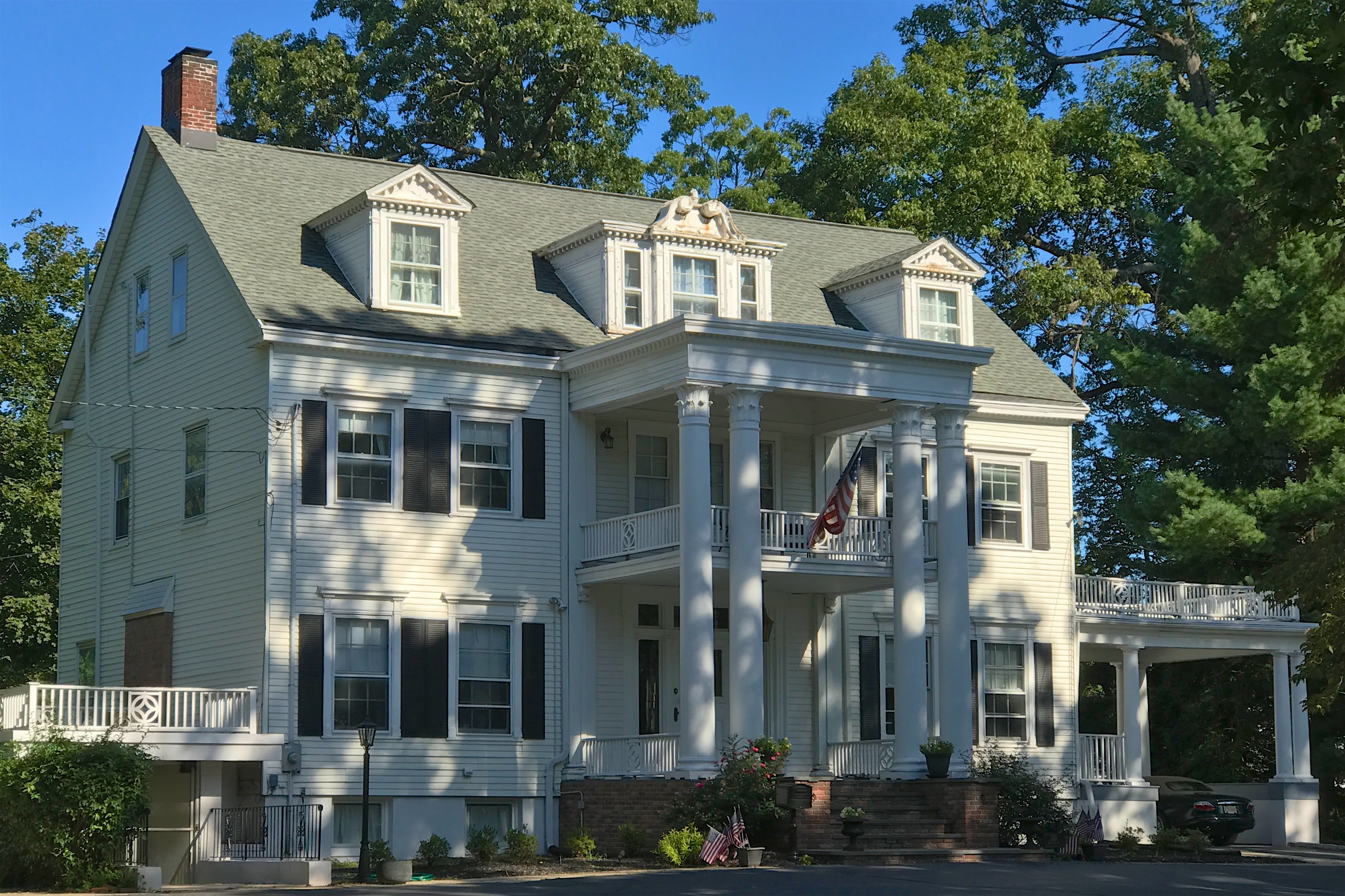
300 Middlesex Avenue
The Corbin House

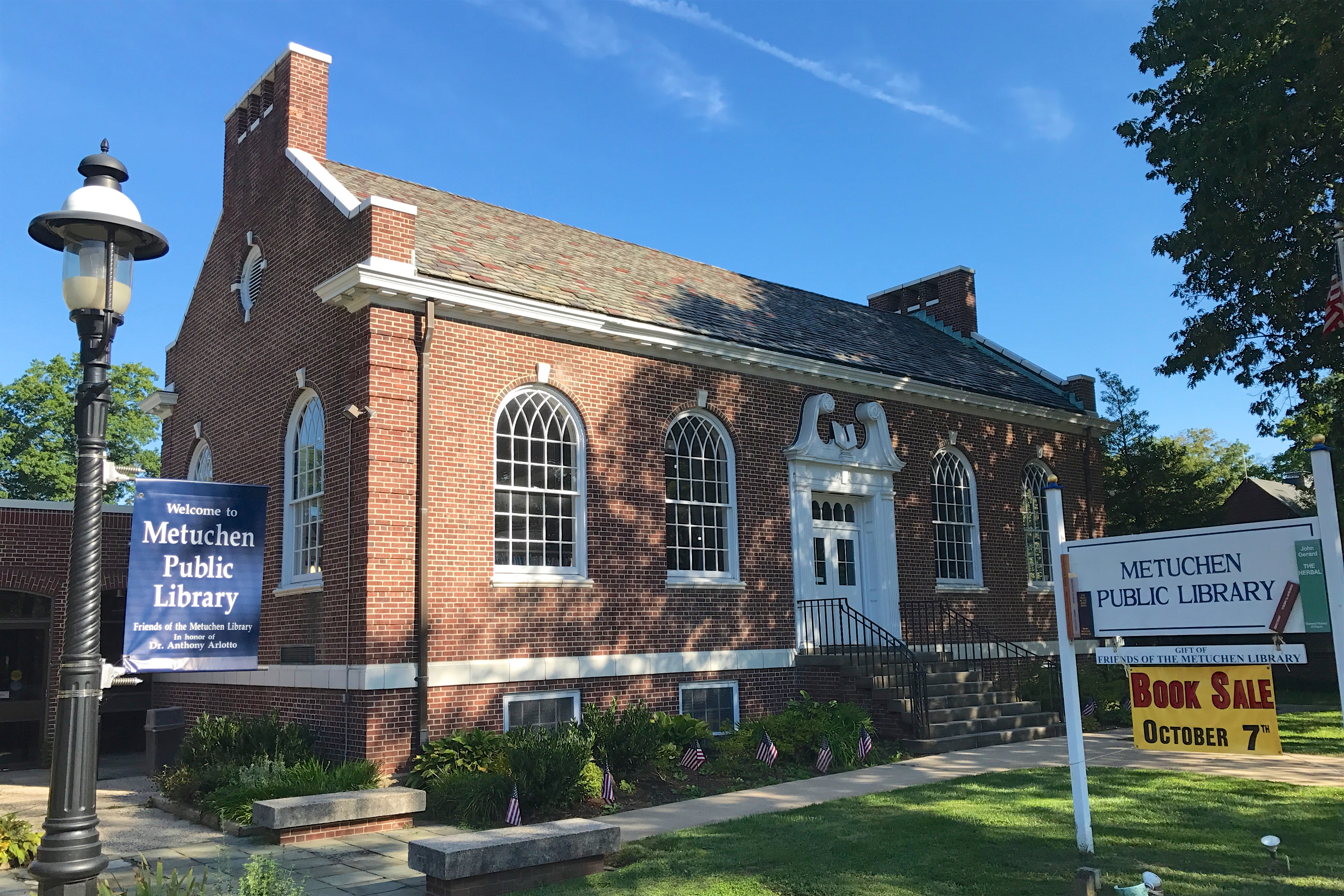
480 Middlesex Avenue
Metuchen Public Library

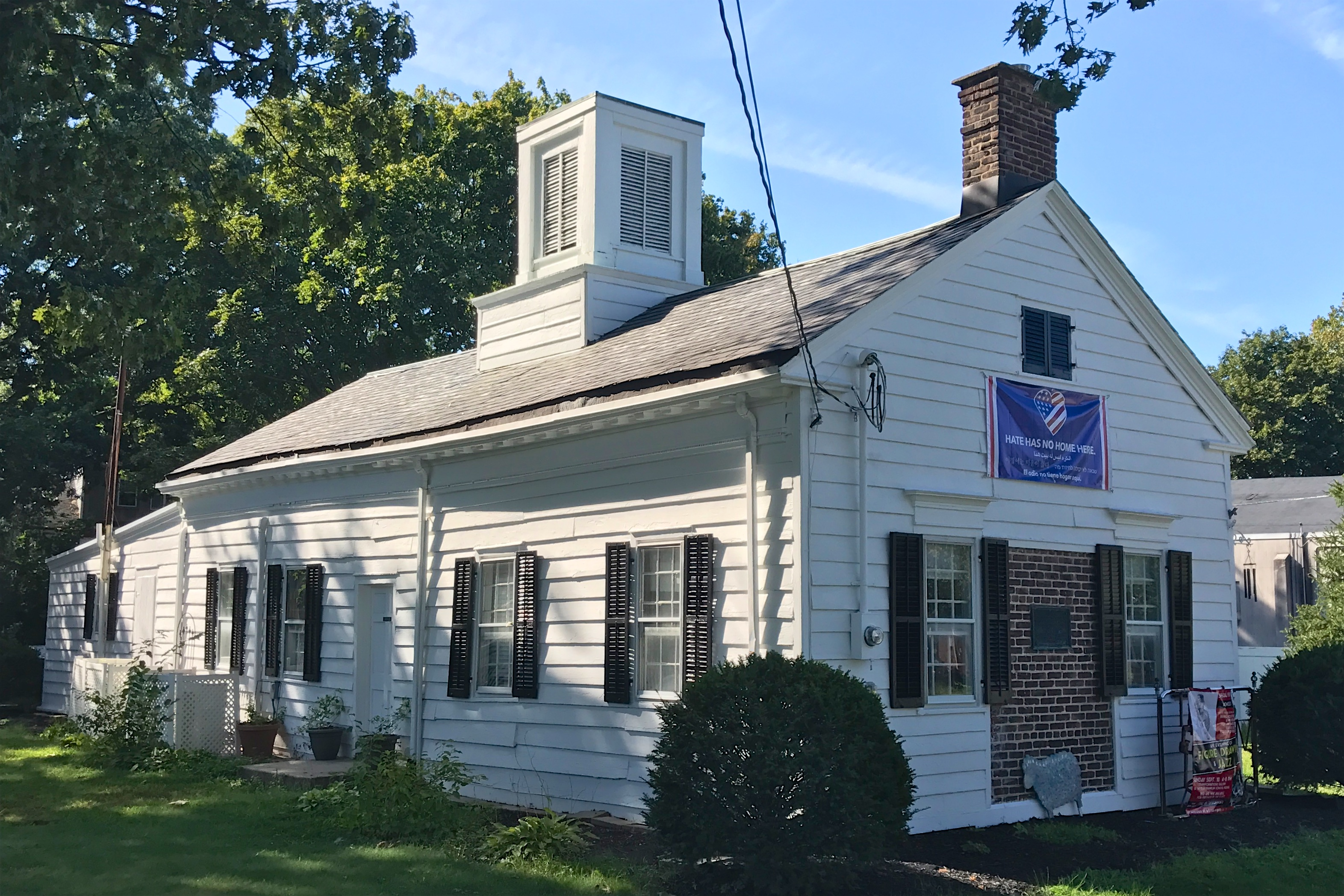
491 Middlesex Avenue
Old Franklin Schoolhouse

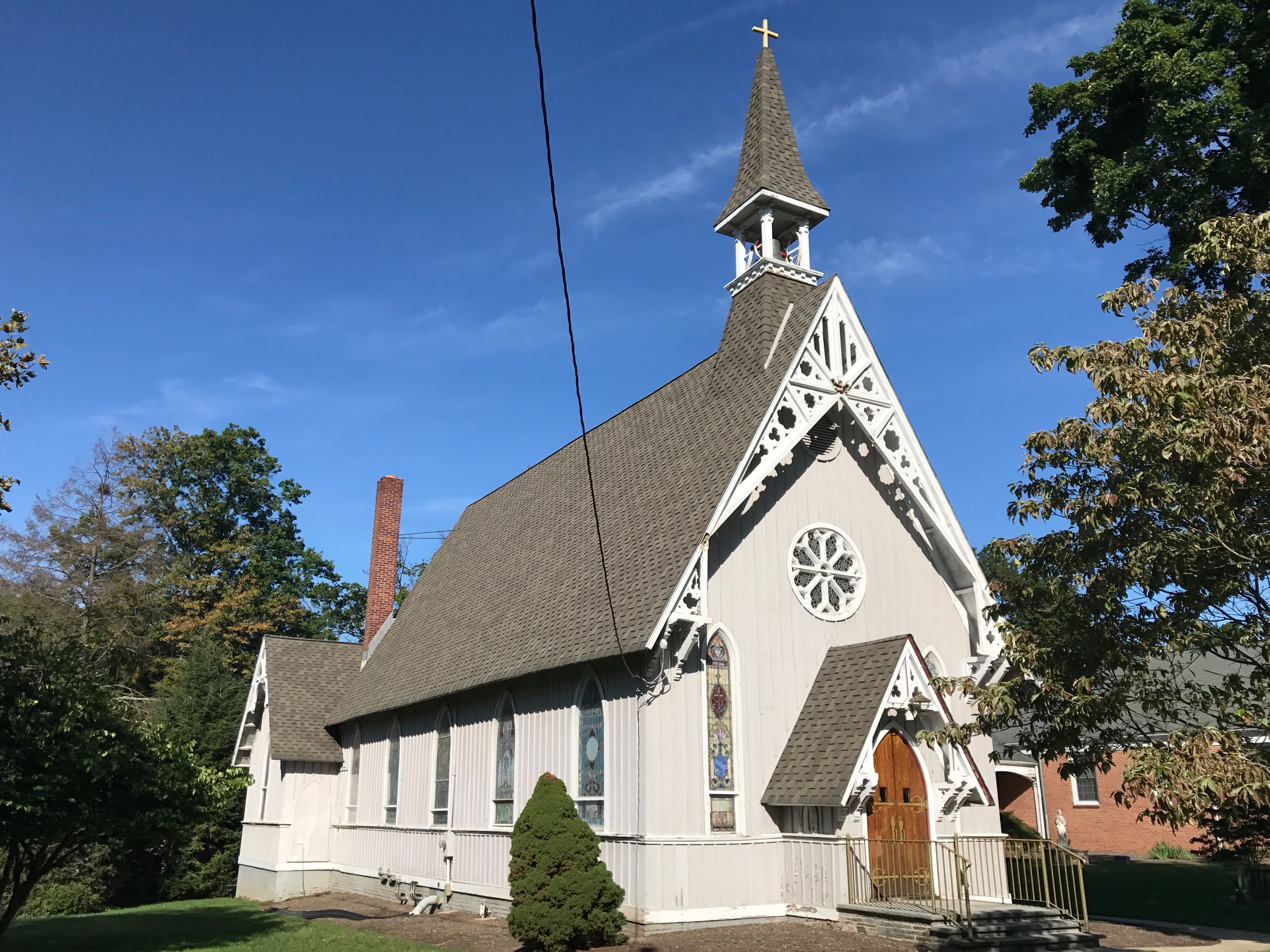
17 Oak Avenue
St. Luke's Episcopal Church
