= Joy Bergelson =

American biologist

Joy Michele Bergelson
- Education: Brown University; University of York; University of Washington
- Scientific career
- Fields: Evolutionary biology
- Workplaces: University of Oxford; Washington University; University of Chicago; New York University
- Thesis: Plant spatial pattern and the invasiveness of annual weeds (1990)

Joy Michele Bergelson is an American evolutionary biologist. She is currently the Dorothy Schiff Professor of Genomics at New York University. Bergelson was previously and James D. Watson Distinguished Service Professor of Ecology and Evolution at the University of Chicago, where she chaired the department for ecology and evolution. Her research focuses on the evolution and ecology of plants.

== Education and career ==
Born in Brooklyn, New York and raised in Metuchen, New Jersey, She graduated in 1980 from Metuchen High School, which inducted her into its hall of fame in 2017.

Bergelson graduated from Brown University with an ScB in Biology in 1984. She went on to further study with a Marshall Scholarship at the University of York, receiving an MPhil in Biology in 1986 and a PhD in zoology from the University of Washington in 1990. Bergelson worked as a demonstrator in Ecology at the University of Oxford, before joining the faculty of the Arts and Sciences at Washington University in St. Louis in 1992. She left St. Louis for Chicago in 1994.

She served as the section chair for Biology of the American Association for the Advancement of Science in 2012.

== Research ==
Bergelson is known for her research on the model plant species Arabidopsis thaliana, its ecology and the evolution of plant-pathogen interactions. Her early research examined interactions between insects and trees, spatial patterns in trees and weeds, and the energetic cost to plants to resist insects. Subsequently, she examined genetic variation in Arabidopsis thaliana, the genetic basis for disease resistance in plants, and polymorphisms in Arabidopsis. Bergelson's research has also examined genetic adaptations in plants to recent climate change.

=== Selected publications ===
- Bergelson, Joy; Purrington, Colin B. (September 1, 1996). "Surveying Patterns in the Cost of Resistance in Plants". The American Naturalist. 148 (3): 536–558. Bibcode:1996ANat..148..536B. doi:10.1086/285938. ISSN 0003-0147. S2CID 85325623.
- Atwell, Susanna; Huang, Yu S.; et al. (June 2010). "Genome-wide association study of 107 phenotypes in Arabidopsis thaliana inbred lines". Nature. 465 (7298): 627–631. Bibcode:2010Natur.465..627A. doi:10.1038/nature08800. PMC 3023908. PMID 20336072.
- Nordborg, Magnus; Hu, Tina T; et al. (May 24, 2005). "The Pattern of Polymorphism in Arabidopsis thaliana". PLOS Biology. 3 (7): e196. doi:10.1371/journal.pbio.0030196. PMC 1135296. PMID 15907155.

== Honors and awards ==
- Elected fellow of the American Association for the Advancement of Science in 2004
- Elected fellow of the National Academy of Sciences in 2018
- Elected fellow of the American Academy of Arts and Sciences in 2020
