= Henry T. Brown =

American engineer (1932–2020)

- Born: June 16, 1932; Cincinnati, Ohio, U.S.
- Died: February 13, 2020 (aged 87); Weston, Massachusetts, U.S.
- Education: Massachusetts Institute of Technology; University of Cincinnati
- Occupation: Chemical engineer

Henry T. Brown (June 16, 1932 – February 13, 2020) was a chemical engineer and the first African American to earn a BS degree in chemical engineering at the University of Cincinnati. Brown was the first African American to enroll in UC's Co-Op program at a time where racial segregation in the U.S was palpably real. He became the first African American director of the American Institute of Chemical Engineers in 1983. He was also the first African American to serve as town government official in both Metuchen, New Jersey and Weston, Massachusetts.

== Education ==
Brown was the first African American to earn a BS degree in chemical engineering at the University of Cincinnati in 1955, and one of the two first African Americans to graduate from University of Cincinnati's co-op course. Brown earned a MS degree in chemical engineering at the Massachusetts Institute of Technology in 1956.

== Career ==
Brown worked as a research scientist for Esso Research and Engineering Company in 1956-1967 and as a development engineer for E.R. Squibb & Sons in 1967–1972. In 1972, Brown joined Polaroid Corporation and worked there until retiring in 1996 (as plant manager of the Integral Coatings Division).

Brown received an honorary doctorate from his alma mater, the University of Cincinnati, in 2001.

Brown received numerous awards, among them the AIChE Minority Affairs Committee's Distinguished Service Award, and became AIChE's first African-American director in 1983 and its second African-American fellow in 1984.

Brown co-founded the Task Force on Minority Youth Guidance and advocated for minorities among the chemical engineering community starting in 1968. He created outreach initiatives and acted as the American Institute of Chemical Engineers (AIChE) Minority Affairs Coordinator 1983–2001. In his honor, the AIChE Minority Affairs Committee Endowment Fund was renamed Henry T. and Melinda C. Brown Endowment for the Education of Underrepresented Minority Chemical Engineers.

Brown co-founded the New Jersey State Urban Science Education Coalition and is a Diamond Life Member of the National Association for the Advancement of Colored People (NAACP). He had been active within the NAACP as an executive board member, membership chairman, advisor to the youth group, publicity chairman, and member of the labor committee in 1957–1965. He was the first African American in town government in Metuchen, New Jersey and served as vice president of the education board in 1971–1972. Brown was also the first African American town official in Weston, Massachusetts, where he joined the town's board of health in 1982 and was chairman for seven years.

== Honors ==
- 1960: Martin K. Simberloff Memorial Award, Urban League of Union County, New Jersey
- 1965: Big Brother Award for Outstanding Service to Youth, University of Cincinnati
- 1983: Distinguished Alumni Award, University of Cincinnati
- 1984: Fellow of the American Institute of Chemical Engineers
- 1996: F. J. and Dorothy Van Antwerpen Award for Service to the institute, AIChE
- 2001: Honorary Doctorate, University of Cincinnati
- 2004: William W. Grimes Award for Excellence in Chemical Engineering, AIChE Minority Affairs Committee
- 2015: Pioneer of Diversity Award, AIChE Minority Affairs Committee
- 2018: Henry T. Brown Endowment for the Education of Underrepresented Minority Chemical Engineers
