= Metuchen High School =

Public secondary school in Middlesex County, New Jersey, United States

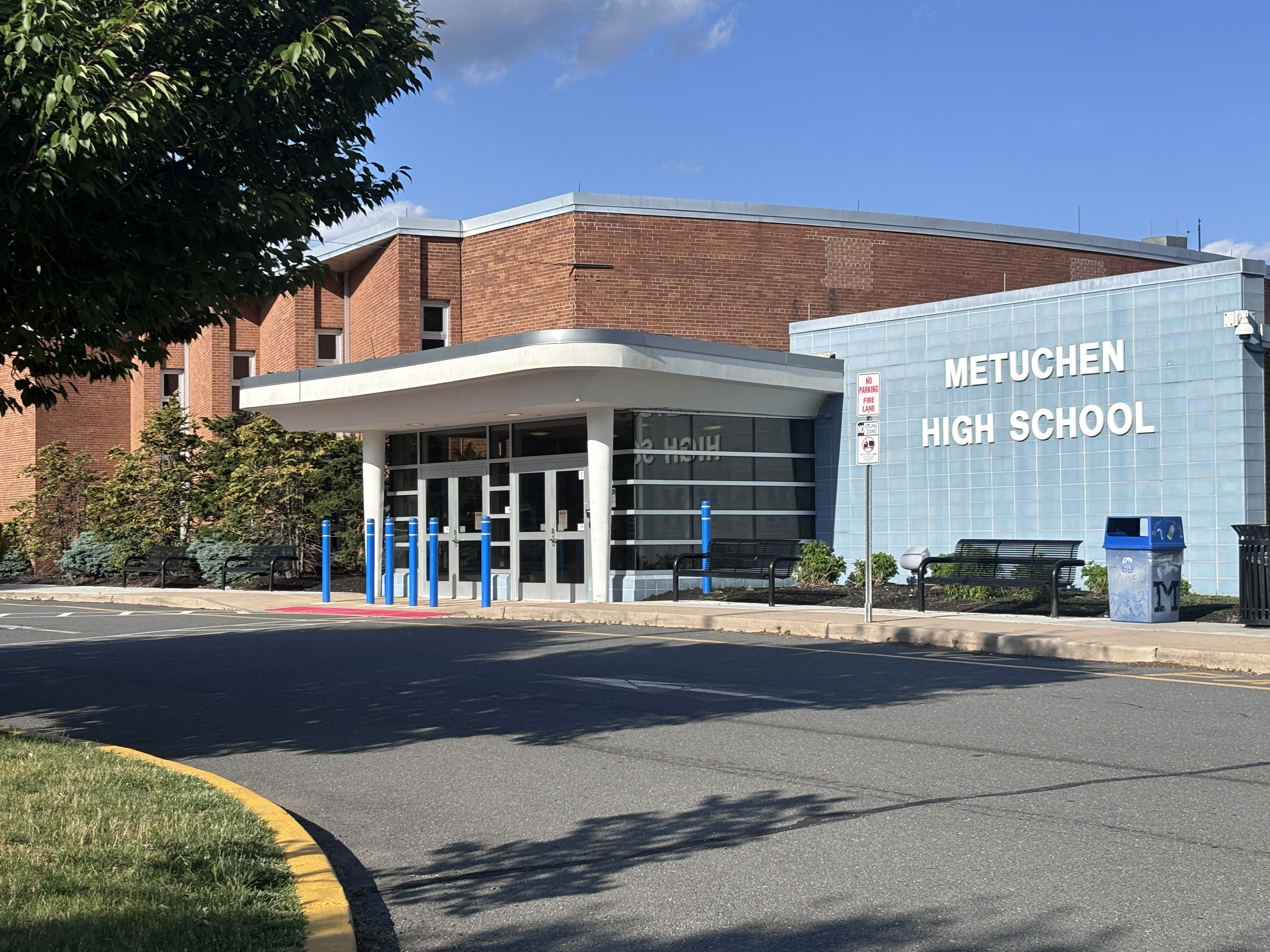

Location
- 400 Grove Avenue; Metuchen, Middlesex County, New Jersey 08840; United States; 40.552984°N 74.356448°W

Information
- Type: Public
- Established: 1909
- School district: Metuchen School District
- NCES School ID: 340999003392
- Principal: Edward C. Porowski
- Faculty: 60.4 FTEs
- Grades: 9-12
- Enrollment: 718 (as of 2024–25)
- Student to teacher ratio: 11.9:1
- Colors: Royal blue and white
- Athletics conference: Greater Middlesex Conference (general); Big Central Football Conference (football)
- Team name: Bulldogs
- Accreditation: Middle States Association of Colleges and Schools
- Website: www.metuchenschools.org/o/mhs

Metuchen High School is a four-year comprehensive public high school that serves students in ninth through twelfth grades from Metuchen in Middlesex County, in the U.S. state of New Jersey, operating as the lone secondary school of the Metuchen School District. The school has been accredited by the Middle States Association of Colleges and Schools Commission on Elementary and Secondary Schools since 1929; the school's accreditation expires in July 2025.

As of the 2024–25 school year, the school had an enrollment of 718 students and 60.4 classroom teachers (on an FTE basis), for a student–teacher ratio of 11.9:1. There were 55 students (7.7% of enrollment) eligible for free lunch and 12 (1.7% of students) eligible for reduced-cost lunch.

== History ==
The district's original high school, constructed at a cost of $45,380 (equivalent to $1.6 million in 2025) was completed in January 1909. The school had a total of 64 students and a graduating class of six. The current facility was completed and formally dedicated in October 1958, at which time the previous building becoming Franklin Middle School.

== Awards, recognition and rankings ==
The school was the 77th-ranked public high school in New Jersey out of 339 schools statewide in New Jersey Monthly magazine's September 2014 cover story on the state's "Top Public High Schools", using a new ranking methodology. The school had been ranked 19th in the state of 328 schools in 2012, after being ranked 54th in 2010 out of 322 schools listed. The magazine ranked the school 86th in 2008 out of 316 schools. The school was ranked 56th in the magazine's September 2006 issue, which surveyed 316 schools across the state. Schooldigger.com ranked the school tied for 99th out of 381 public high schools statewide in its 2011 rankings (a decrease of 26 positions from the 2010 ranking) which were based on the combined percentage of students classified as proficient or above proficient on the mathematics (88.6%) and language arts literacy (94.7%) components of the High School Proficiency Assessment (HSPA).

== Athletics ==
The Metuchen High School Bulldogs compete in the Greater Middlesex Conference, which is comprised of public and private high schools located in the Middlesex County area. The league operates under the supervision of the New Jersey State Interscholastic Athletic Association (NJSIAA). With 522 students in grades 10-12, the school was classified by the NJSIAA for the 2019–20 school year as Group II for most athletic competition purposes, which included schools with an enrollment of 486 to 758 students in that grade range. The football team competes in Division 2B of the Big Central Football Conference, which includes 60 public and private high schools in Hunterdon, Middlesex, Somerset, Union and Warren counties, which are broken down into 10 divisions by size and location. The school was classified by the NJSIAA as Group II South for football for 2024–2026, which included schools with 514 to 685 students.

The school participates together with J. P. Stevens High School in a joint ice hockey team in which Edison High School is the host school / lead agency. The co-op program operates under agreements ending in June 2028.

The school was recognized as the Group I winner of the NJSIAA ShopRite Cup in 2006–07, which recognizes overall athletic achievement by schools in Groups I-IV, Group A and Group B, based on the all-around best athletic program within each group in the state of New Jersey. The award for the 2006-07 ShopRite Cup recognized the school for achieving 2nd place in girls' soccer, 2nd in boys' soccer, 1st in girls' cross country, 4th in boys' cross country, a tie for 3rd in football, and 1st in boys' track and field. The team repeated as Group I winner in the 2007-08 ShopRite Cup, with first-place finishes in girls' soccer, boys' winter track relays and boys' spring track, a second-place finish in boys' winter track individual and a third place in girls' cross-country, with an additional nine points awarded for having no disqualifications in all three athletic seasons.

The boys track team won the Group II spring / outdoor track state championship in 1940 (as co-champion) and won the Group I title in 1995, 1997, 1999, 2002, 2006-2008.

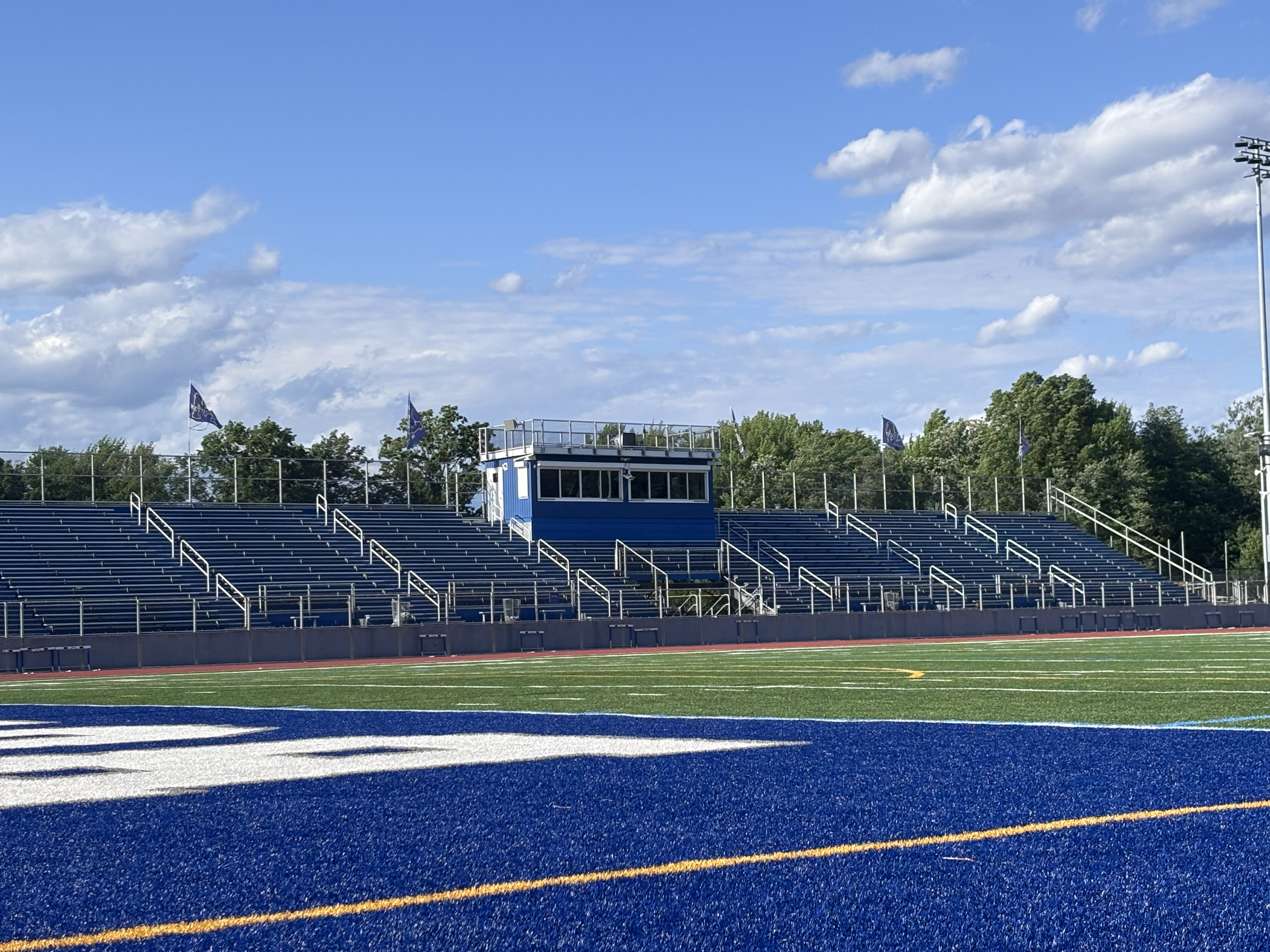
Football field of MHS

The boys' cross country team won the Group III state championship in 1953, won the Group II title in 1961 and won the Group I championship in 1994, 2015, 2016, 2023 and 2024. In 2017, the team became the first Group I school to win the Greater Middlesex County championship.

The boys' track team won the indoor relay championship in Group I/II in 1972 and 1973 (as co-champion with Saddle Brook High School), and the Group I title in 1992, 1997, 1999, 2003 and 2008; The seven titles are tied for third-most among public high schools in the state. The girls team won the indoor relay title in Group I in 1996.

The 1985 football team won the Central Jersey Group I state sectional title with a 7-0 victory against Keyport High School in the championship game.

The boys' track team won the winter / indoor track state championship in Group I in 1990 (as co-champion), 1993, 1997 and 1999. The girls team won the Group I title in 1996.

The girls' track team won the winter track Group I state title in 1994 and 1996.

The girls' cross country team won the Group I state championship in 2006, 2012, 2016 and 2017, and won the Group II title in 2018.

In 2007, the girls' soccer team won the Central Jersey, Group I state sectional championship with a 1–0 win over Robbinsville High School in the tournament final. The win marked the team's third consecutive sectional title, their first three-peat since 1988–90. The team moved on to win the Group I state championship with a 1–0 win over Glen Ridge High School in the tournament final, the team's first ever state title.

=== Marching band ===
The Pride of Metuchen High School Marching Band consists of over 80 wind, percussion, and color guard members. The band performs at all school football games and participates in many Tournament of Bands and USBands competitions located in the New Jersey area. At the 2013 New Jersey state championships at Rutgers University, the marching band won 3rd place in Group 4 Open competition. The Pride of Metuchen were the 2015-16 Tournament of Bands Group 3 A, Atlantic Coast Champions. The band won Tournament of Bands 2022-23 Region VII and New Jersey State Championships for Group 4A.

== Administration ==
The school's principal is Edward C. Porowski. His administration team includes the assistant principal.

== Notable alumni ==
- Joy Bergelson (class of 1980), evolutionary biologist who is the Dorothy Schiff Professor of Genomics at New York University
- Marqus Blakely (born 1988, class of 2006), basketball player who has played for the Houston Rockets
- Padi Boyd, astrophysicist who is the head of NASA's Exoplanets and Stellar Astrophysics Laboratory
- David Copperfield (born 1956), illusionist
- Scott Cowen (born 1946, class of 1964), 14th president of Tulane University
- Paula Danziger (1944-2004), children's author who wrote more than 30 books, including her 1974 debut young adult novel, The Cat Ate My Gymsuit
- Jim Fielding, track star
- Gail Fisher (1935-2000), pioneering African American actress best known for her role in Mannix TV series
- Katelynn Flaherty (born 1996, class of 2014), former basketball player for the Michigan Wolverines, who is the school's all-time leading scorer in points, man or woman, with 2,776 career points
- Robert Hegyes (1951-2012), TV actor, best known for his role as Epstein on the 1970s sitcom Welcome Back, Kotter
- KC Navarro (born 1999, class of 2017), professional wrestler with Total Nonstop Action Wrestling
- Brian Ralph (born 1973), alternative cartoonist, whose graphic novel, Daybreak, was adapted for the Netflix series Daybreak
- Nancy A. Roseman (class of 1976), 28th president of Dickinson College
- Tom Ruegger, animator, screenwriter, storyboard artist and lyricist, who created Animaniacs and Histeria!
- Quinn Shephard (born 1995), actress, writer, director and producer, whose directorial debut film Blame was shot in Metuchen and in the school
- Robert Taub (born 1955, class of 1973), concert pianist, recording artist, scholar, author and entrepreneur
- Jack Waldman (1952–1986), jazz and rock musician, composer, producer, vocalist and multi-instrumentalist
- Richard Wenk (born 1956, class of 1974), screenwriter and director best known for his work on The Expendables 2 (2012), The Equalizer (2014), and The Magnificent Seven (2016)
- Julian E. Zelizer (born 1969), author, professor of political history at Princeton University and CNN contributor
