= Metuchen, New Jersey =

Borough in Middlesex County, New Jersey, US

- Borough
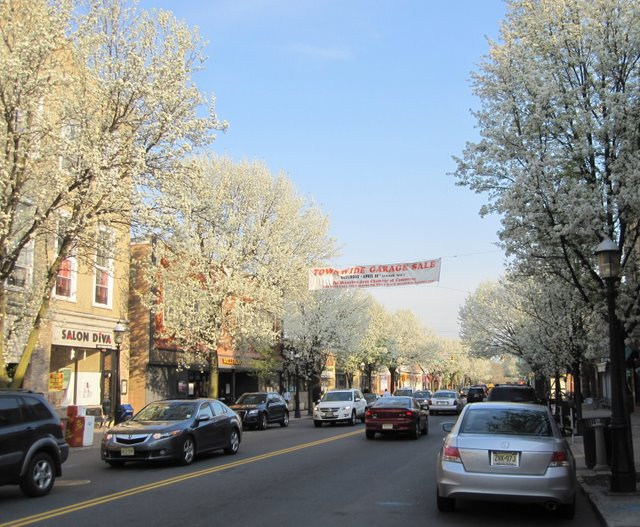
- Main Street in downtown Metuchen, which won the honor of Great American Main Street of the Year in 2023

- Seal
- Nickname: The Brainy Borough
- Location of Metuchen in Middlesex County highlighted in red (left). Inset map: Location of Middlesex County in New Jersey highlighted in orange (right).

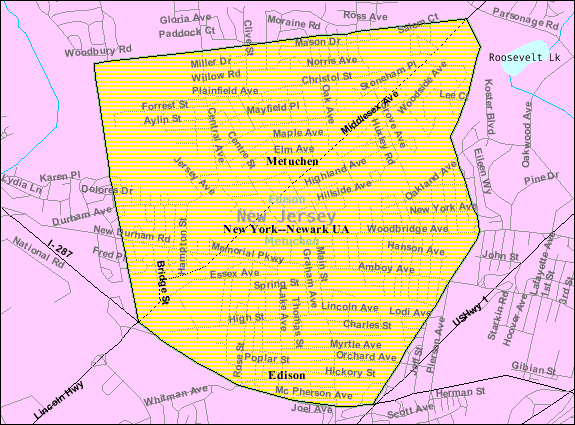
- Census Bureau map of Metuchen, New Jersey

- Location in Middlesex County Location in New Jersey Location in the United States
- Coordinates: 40.542445°N 74.362767°W
- Country: United States
- State: New Jersey
- County: Middlesex
- Incorporated: March 20, 1900

Government
  - Type: Borough
  - Body: Borough Council
  - Mayor: Jonathan Busch (D, term ends December 31, 2027)
  - Administrator: Melissa Perilstein
  - Municipal clerk: Deborah Zupan

Area
  - Total: 2.84 sq mi (7.36 km^{2})
  - Land: 2.84 sq mi (7.35 km^{2})
  - Water: 0.0039 sq mi (0.01 km^{2}) 0.07%
  - Rank: 348th of 565 in state 18th of 25 in county
- Elevation: 95 ft (29 m)

Population (2020)
  - Total: 15,049
  - Estimate (2024): 15,470 ▲
  - Rank: 175th of 565 in state 17th of 25 in county
  - Density: 5,282.2/sq mi (2,039.5/km^{2})
  - Rank: 105th of 565 in state 9th of 25 in county
- Time zone: UTC−05:00 (Eastern (EST))
  - Summer (DST): UTC−04:00 (Eastern (EDT))
- ZIP Code: 08840
- Area code: 732
- FIPS code: 3402145690
- GNIS feature ID: 0885298
- Website: www.metuchennj.org

Metuchen (/məˈtʌtʃən/ mə-TUTCH-ən) is a suburban borough in Middlesex County in the U.S. state of New Jersey. The borough is a commuter town of New York City, located in the heart of the Raritan Valley region within the New York Metropolitan area. The borough, along with Edison (which completely surrounds Metuchen), is a regional commercial hub for Central New Jersey. The borough is 6 miles (9.7 km) northeast of New Brunswick, 17 miles (27 km) southwest of Newark, 20 miles (32 km) southwest of Jersey City, and 22 miles (35 km) southwest of Manhattan. As of the 2020 United States census, the borough's population was 15,049, an increase of 1,475 (+10.9%) from the 2010 census count of 13,574, which in turn had reflected an increase of 734 (+5.7%) from the 12,840 counted at the 2000 census.

Metuchen was incorporated as a borough by an act of the New Jersey Legislature on March 20, 1900, from portions of Raritan Township (Since renamed to Edison). Metuchen's Main Street won Great American Main Street of the Year in 2023. Metuchen is nicknamed The Brainy Borough.

== History ==
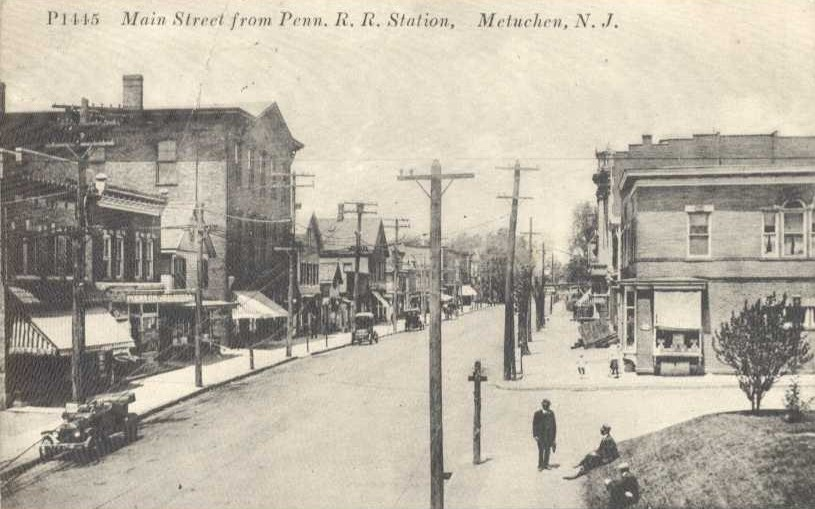
View from train station 1911

The earliest residents of the area were the Raritan people of the Lenape Native Americans, who lived in the area and travelled through it to the shore. In 1646, Chief Matouchin was part of a group that included 1,200 warriors.

Until 1870, what is now Metuchen was part of Woodbridge Township. The settlers in the western part of the township developed their own separate identity, because they were so far removed from the main settlement of Woodbridge. The name "Metuchen" first appeared in 1688/1689, and its name was derived from the name of a Native American chief, whose name was variously spelled as Matouchin or Matochshegan. In 1701, an overseer of roads was appointed for "Metuchen district". In 1705, Main Street was laid out at the same time as the road from Metuchen to Woodbridge, which one source calls a "reworking of the original road".

Sometime between 1717 and 1730, a meeting house was constructed for weekday meetings conducted by the pastor of the Woodbridge Presbyterian Church. In 1756, Metuchen Presbyterians succeeded in forming their own congregation, attesting to their growing numbers. In 1770, the congregations merged, with Metuchen getting 2/5 of the pastor's services and Woodbridge 3/5; by 1772, Metuchen had grown sufficiently to warrant half of his time. In 1793, the two churches again separated.

Metuchen was little changed from the late 18th to the early 19th century. A map from 1799 shows ten buildings in the center of the community along Main Street. By 1834, a Presbyterian church, a store, two taverns and about a dozen dwellings could be found. The opening of the Middlesex and Essex Turnpike (now Middlesex Avenue, portions in concurrency with Route 27) in 1806, and the Perth Amboy and Bound Brook Turnpike in 1808 did not spur growth. Not until the beginning of the railroad era did commercial and residential development surge.

In 1836, the New Jersey Railroad was completed to New Brunswick. The construction of a station at Main Street made it inevitable that this would develop as the principal street. A business section soon began to appear between Middlesex Avenue and the railroad tracks, and commercial and service establishments gradually began to assume a more modern aspect (the typical 18th century tavern, for example, was replaced by the equally typical 19th century hotel).

The second half of the 19th century was a period of social, cultural and religious diversification in Metuchen. Between 1859 and 1866 the Reformed Church was organized, the first Catholic mass was celebrated and St. Luke's Episcopal Church was founded. In 1870 both the Building and Loan Association and the library opened, the same year that Raritan Township was incorporated. As the largest village in the new township, Metuchen naturally became its commercial and cultural center and acquired substantial political control. In 1873, the town hosted Howard Newton Fuller and the Rutgers College Glee Club in the first-ever performance of their alma mater. In 1879, the literary and debating society was formed, and in 1883 the Village Improvement Society. By 1882, Metuchen School #15 had an enrollment of 256 pupils, and by 1885 the New Jersey Gazette listed 37 businesses.

The decade of the 1890s was a period of expansion for public utilities. In 1894, telegraph service was begun and in 1897 telephone service begun by the N.Y. and N.J. Telephone Company. In the same year the Midland Water Company began operation and supplied hydrants for "newly formed" volunteer fire companies. In 1899, a new street lighting system was installed. At about the same time a bicycling organization was formed, the Metuchen Wheelmen, which lobbied for improved roads. Trolley service began in 1900. In addition, commerce had grown to such an extent that the New Brunswick Directory listed 91 businesses in 1899.

Metuchen attracted an influx of artists, literary figures and noted intellectuals during this time, acquiring the nickname "the Brainy Boro". One of the Borough's two post offices is named Brainy Boro Station.

The new century began with the borough's incorporation, in 1900.

On November 19, 1981, Metuchen became the Seat of the newly established Roman Catholic Diocese of Metuchen. The diocese includes Hunterdon, Middlesex, Somerset and Warren counties and more than 500,000 Catholics.

Metuchen Borough Hall, dedicated in 2005, replaced a structure built in 1924 during the City Beautiful movement.

From 1948 until 2004, the Ford Motor Company manufactured seven million Ford and Mercury vehicles, including the Ford Mustang, at Edison Assembly, which was named for Metuchen until 1980.

In 2022, Metuchen was nominated as one of the eight semifinalists for the 2023 Great American Main Street Award . They later won the award.

American Girl's 2023 "Girl of the Year" character, Kavi Sharma, is described as being from Metuchen. She is the first "Girl of the Year" doll of South Asian ancestry.

In April 2024, Metuchen was named by Money Magazine as the best place to live in New Jersey and one of the best to live in the country.

== Geography ==
According to the United States Census Bureau, the borough had a total area of 2.85 square miles (7.39 km^{2}), including 2.85 square miles (7.38 km^{2}) of land and <0.01 square miles (0.01 km^{2}) of water (0.07%).

The Borough of Metuchen is completely surrounded by Edison, making it part of 21 pairs of "doughnut towns" in the state, where one municipality entirely surrounds another.

Unincorporated communities, localities and place names located partially or completely within the township include Jefferson Park and Robinvale.

Metuchen has been a state-designated "town center" since 1996 and "transit village" since 2001. The borough has been recognized for its smart growth development. Plans to build a residential and commercial center with 700 parking spaces on a parking lot adjacent to the train station were announced in July 2014.

== Demographics ==
Historical population
Census	Pop.	Note	%±
1890	770		—
1900	770		0.0%
1910	2,138		177.7%
1920	3,334		55.9%
1930	5,748		72.4%
1940	6,557		14.1%
1950	9,879		50.7%
1960	14,041		42.1%
1970	16,031		14.2%
1980	13,762		−14.2%
1990	12,804		−7.0%
2000	12,840		0.3%
2010	13,574		5.7%
2020	15,049		10.9%
2024 (est.)	15,470	▲	2.8%
Population sources: 1890 1900–1920; 1900–1910 1910–1930; 1940–2000 2000; 2010 2020

=== 2020 census ===
As of the 2020 census, Metuchen had a population of 15,049. The median age was 41.5 years. 22.9% of residents were under the age of 18 and 16.3% of residents were 65 years of age or older. For every 100 females there were 93.3 males, and for every 100 females age 18 and over there were 89.3 males age 18 and over.

100.0% of residents lived in urban areas, while 0.0% lived in rural areas.

There were 5,822 households in Metuchen, of which 34.4% had children under the age of 18 living in them. Of all households, 56.7% were married-couple households, 12.7% were households with a male householder and no spouse or partner present, and 25.1% were households with a female householder and no spouse or partner present. About 24.0% of all households were made up of individuals and 11.0% had someone living alone who was 65 years of age or older. The average household size was 2.83 and the average family size was 3.35.

There were 6,053 housing units, of which 3.8% were vacant. The homeowner vacancy rate was 0.5% and the rental vacancy rate was 5.2%.

Racial composition as of the 2020 census
Race	Number	Percent
White	9,588	63.7%
Black or African American	702	4.7%
American Indian and Alaska Native	36	0.2%
Asian	2,841	18.9%
Native Hawaiian and Other Pacific Islander	3	0.0%
Some other race	458	3.0%
Two or more races	1,421	9.4%
Hispanic or Latino (of any race)	1,510	10.0%

=== Income and poverty ===
The Census Bureau's American Community Survey 5 Year Data (2009-2021) showed that median household income was $141,915 (with a margin of error of +/− $8,343) and the median family income was $163,438 (+/− $8,003). The per capita income for the borough was $61,344 (+/− $3,711). About 1.7% of families and 3.4% of the population were below the poverty line, including 1.1% of those under age 18 and 10.2% of those age 65 or over.

=== 2010 census ===
The 2010 United States census counted 13,574 people, 5,243 households, and 3,744 families in the borough. The population density was 4,910.4 per square mile (1,895.9/km^{2}). There were 5,440 housing units at an average density of 1,967.9 per square mile (759.8/km^{2}). The racial makeup was 77.92% (10,577) White, 4.88% (662) Black or African American, 0.07% (10) Native American, 12.96% (1,759) Asian, 0.02% (3) Pacific Islander, 1.39% (189) from other races, and 2.76% (374) from two or more races. Hispanic or Latino of any race were 6.89% (935) of the population.

Of the 5,243 households, 33.6% had children under the age of 18; 58.3% were married couples living together; 10.1% had a female householder with no husband present and 28.6% were non-families. Of all households, 23.9% were made up of individuals and 9.9% had someone living alone who was 65 years of age or older. The average household size was 2.59 and the average family size was 3.10.

24.2% of the population were under the age of 18, 5.4% from 18 to 24, 26.8% from 25 to 44, 29.7% from 45 to 64, and 13.8% who were 65 years of age or older. The median age was 41.1 years. For every 100 females, the population had 93.1 males. For every 100 females ages 18 and older there were 88.2 males.

The Census Bureau's 2006–2010 American Community Survey showed that (in 2010 inflation-adjusted dollars) median household income was $94,410 (with a margin of error of +/− $10,474) and the median family income was $126,123 (+/− $7,549). Males had a median income of $78,974 (+/− $8,613) versus $57,271 (+/− $5,731) for females. The per capita income for the borough was $46,949 (+/− $3,227). About 1.9% of families and 2.5% of the population were below the poverty line, including 3.8% of those under age 18 and 5.7% of those age 65 or over.

=== 2000 census ===
As of the 2000 United States census there were 12,840 people, 4,992 households, and 3,584 families residing in the borough. The population density was 4,684.8 inhabitants per square mile (1,808.8/km^{2}). There were 5,104 housing units at an average density of 1,862.2 per square mile (719.0/km^{2}). The racial makeup of the borough was 93.30% White, 3.38% African American, 0.10% Native American, 7.23% Asian, 1.12% from other races, and 1.86% from two or more races. Hispanic or Latino of any race were 3.96% of the population.

There were 4,992 households, out of which 32.5% had children under the age of 18 living with them, 58.8% were married couples living together, 10.0% had a female householder with no husband present, and 28.2% were non-families. 23.0% of all households were made up of individuals, and 9.6% had someone living alone who was 65 years of age or older. The average household size was 2.57 and the average family size was 3.05.

In the borough the population was spread out, with 23.3% under the age of 18, 5.3% from 18 to 24, 31.3% from 25 to 44, 25.2% from 45 to 64, and 14.9% who were 65 years of age or older. The median age was 40 years. For every 100 females, there were 91.6 males. For every 100 females age 18 and over, there were 87.1 males.

The median income for a household in the borough was $75,546, and the median income for a family was $85,022. Males had a median income of $58,125 versus $43,097 for females. The per capita income for the borough was $36,749. About 3.4% of families and 3.9% of the population were below the poverty line, including 3.6% of those under age 18 and 4.9% of those age 65 or over.

== Parks and recreation ==
Metuchen includes a variety of public spaces, parks, historical sites, a war memorial, and a greenway.

The Middlesex Greenway is a 3.5-mile (5.6 km) mixed-use bicycle and pedestrian paved trail between Metuchen and Woodbridge Township. It is part of the East Coast Greenway.

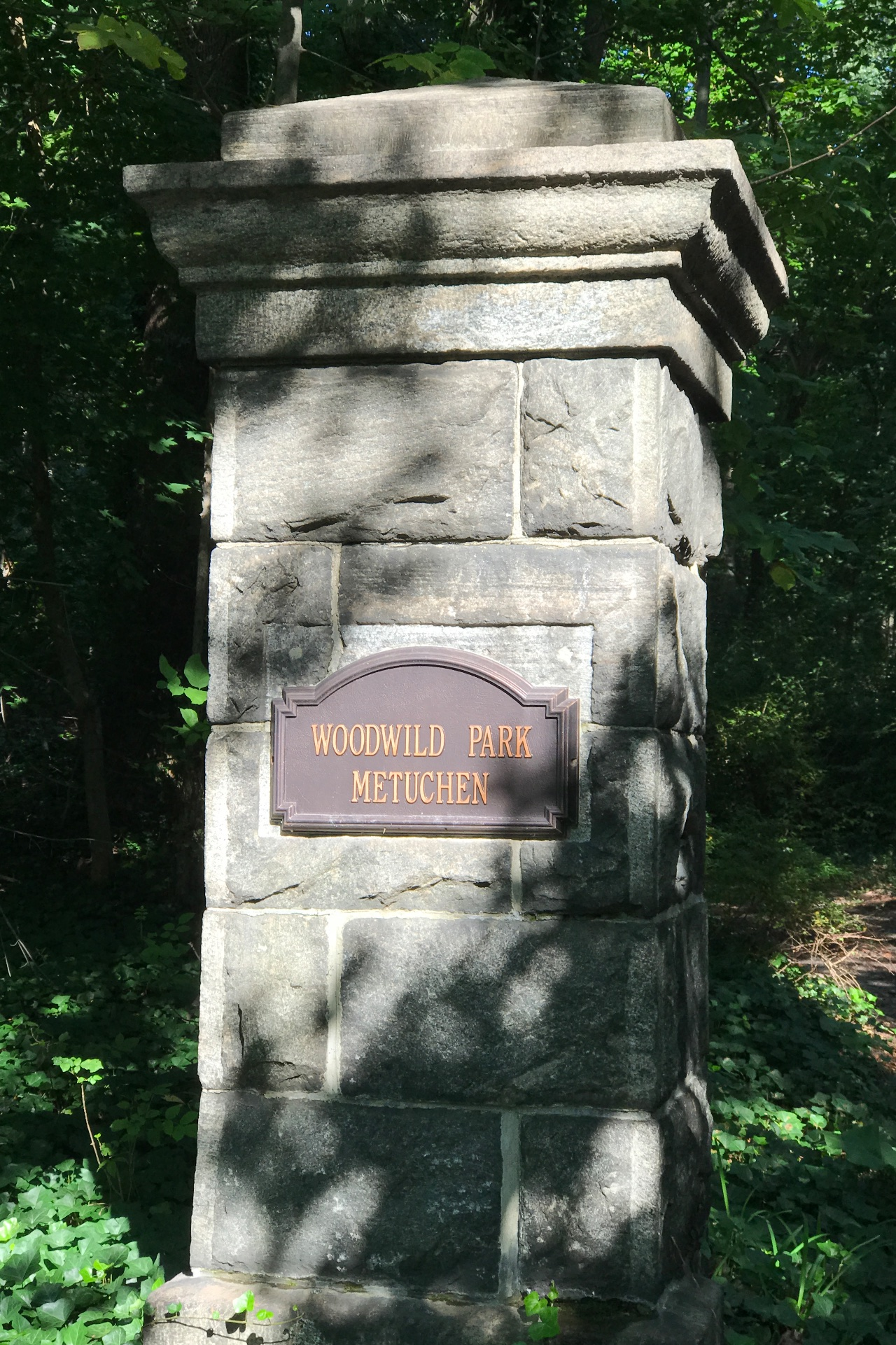
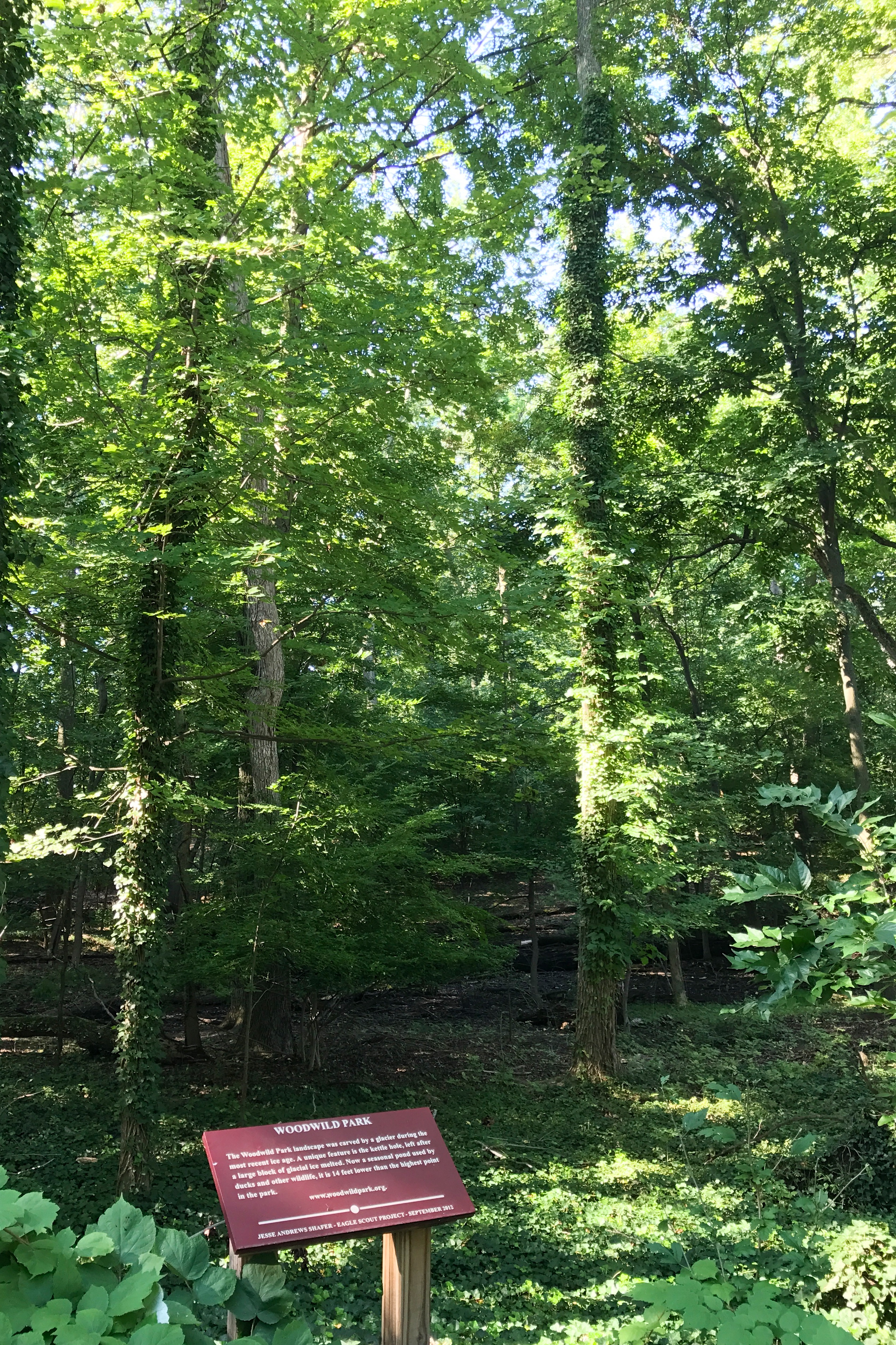
Woodwild Park entrance and forest area

Covering 13 acres (5.3 ha), Centennial Park is Metuchen's largest park and is accessible from Grove Avenue. The park includes Beacon Hill, which at 169 feet (52 m) is the highest point in the borough.

Woodwild Park is a 3.5-acre (1.4 ha) park consisting of undeveloped land that is managed by the Woodwild Park Association and accessible from Middlesex Avenue. It is part of the Middlesex Avenue–Woodwild Park Historic District, which was listed on the National Register of Historic Places on July 31, 2017.

George Olmezer Memorial Park is a park dedicated to George Olmezer, a councilman for Metuchen and former member of the Borough Council. It was established in 1982. Olmezer died in 1981 at 68.

Metuchen Memorial Park is a war memorial that was created starting in 1925 to honor those who served during World War I and has been updated since then to honor those Metuchen residents who served in other of the nation's wars. For 90 years, the park has been the planned destination of the borough's annual Memorial Day Parade.

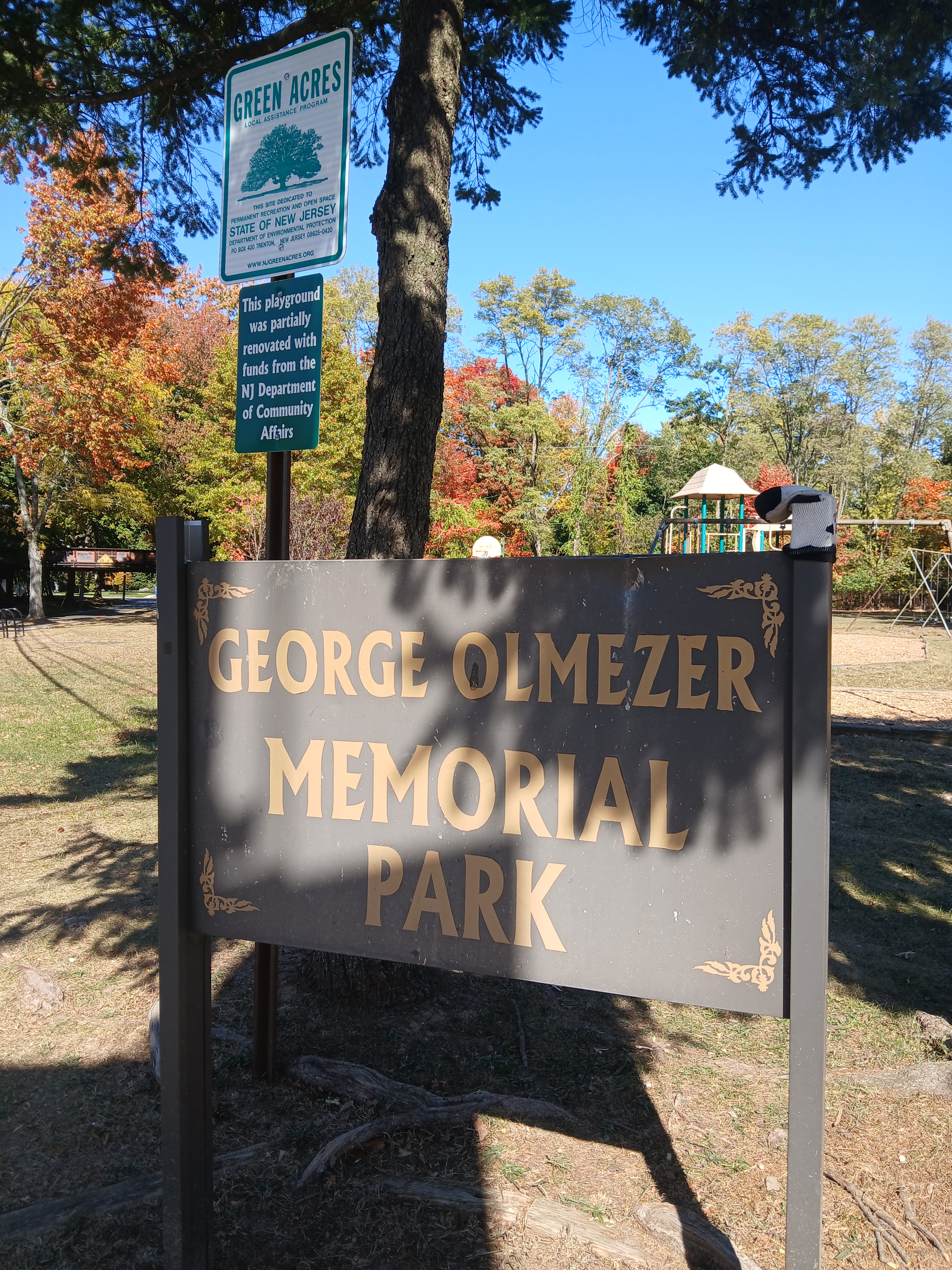
Sign in front of George Olmezer Memorial Park

Tommy's Pond, on a 1.8-acre (0.73 ha) site donated to the borough in 1929, includes a 0.4-acre (0.16 ha) pond that is used for an annual fishing derby. The pond has also been used in the past for ice skating during the winter.

The Dismal Swamp is a nearby natural area known as the "Everglades of Central New Jersey."

== Government ==
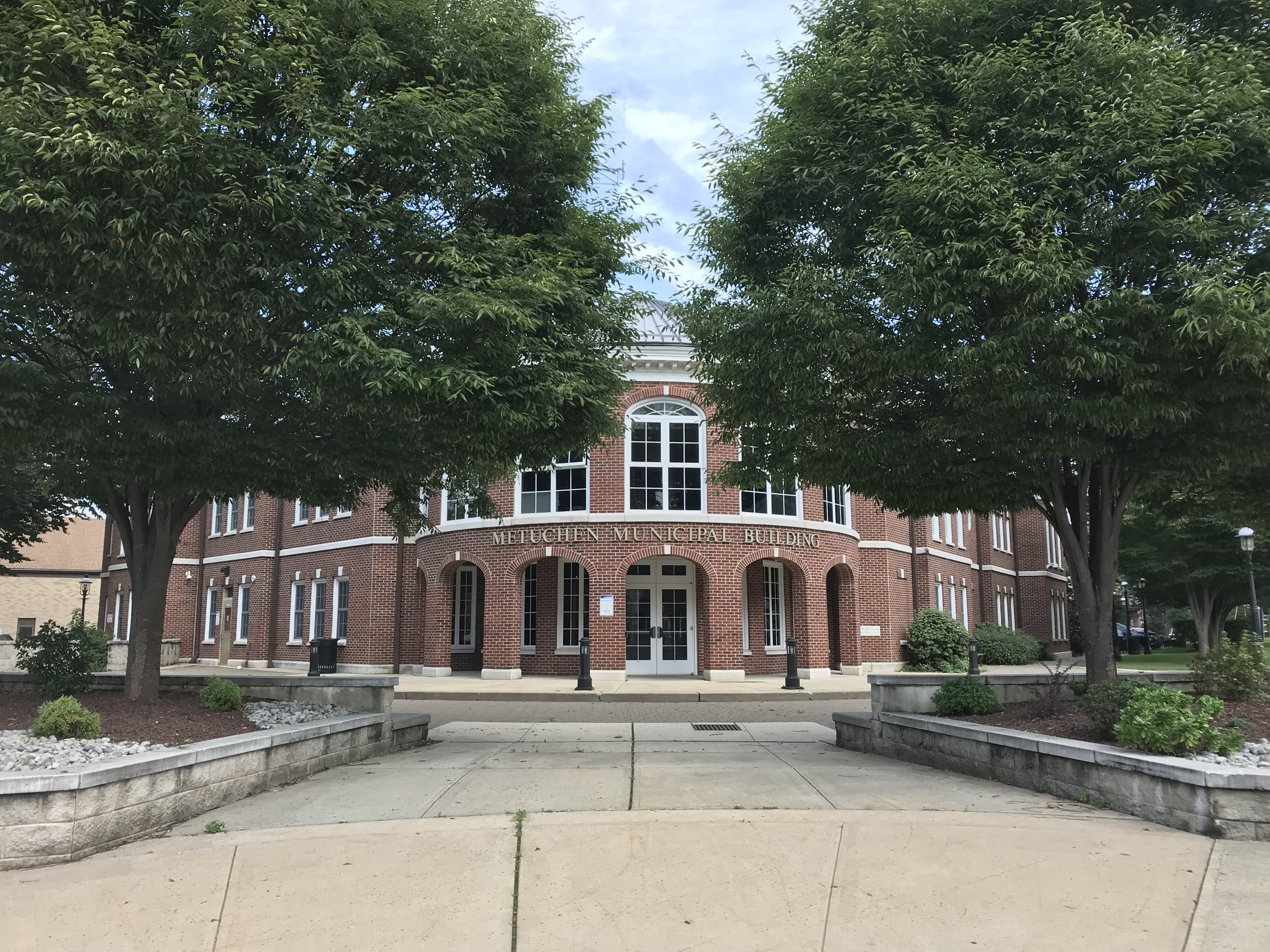
Borough Hall

=== Local government ===
Metuchen is governed under the borough form of New Jersey municipal government, which is used in 218 municipalities (of the 564) statewide, making it the most common form of government in New Jersey. The governing body is comprised of the mayor and the borough council, with all positions elected at-large on a partisan basis as part of the November general election. A mayor is elected directly by the voters to a four-year term of office. The borough council includes six members elected to serve three-year terms on a staggered basis, with two seats coming up for election each year in a three-year cycle. The borough form of government used by Metuchen is a "weak mayor / strong council" government in which council members act as the legislative body with the mayor presiding at meetings and voting only in the event of a tie. The mayor can veto ordinances subject to an override by a two-thirds majority vote of the council. The mayor makes committee and liaison assignments for council members, and most appointments are made by the mayor with the advice and consent of the council.

As of 2026, the mayor of Metuchen is Democrat Jonathan Busch, whose term of office ends December 31, 2027; Busch took office as mayor when he was appointed in December 2017 to fill the balance of the four-year term that had been held by Peter Cammarano ending December 31, 2019, and was elected in November 2018 to serve the balance of the term of office. Members of the borough council are Council President Jason Delia (D, 2027), Joel Branch (D, 2027), Lisa Hyman (D, 2028), Vinita Jethwani (D, 2026), Tyler Kandel (D, 2026) and Meg Loftus Suchan (D, 2028).

In January 2019, the borough council unanimously selected Daniel Hirsch from a list of three candidates nominated by the Democratic municipal committee to fill the seat expiring in December 2020 that became vacant following the resignation of Reed Leibfried. Hirsch served on an interim basis until the November 2019 general election, when he was elected to serve the balance of the term of office.

In December 2017, Jonathan Busch was selected from three names submitted by the Democratic municipal committee to fill the seat expiring in December 2019 that had been held by Peter Cammarano until he resigned from office to become the chief of staff for Governor of New Jersey Phil Murphy.

=== Federal, state and county representation ===
Metuchen is located in the 6th Congressional District and is part of New Jersey's 18th state legislative district.

For the 119th United States Congress, New Jersey's 6th congressional district is represented by Frank Pallone (D, Long Branch). New Jersey is represented in the United States Senate by Democrats Cory Booker (Newark, term ends 2027) and Andy Kim (Moorestown, term ends 2031).

For the 2026–2027 session, the 18th legislative district of the New Jersey Legislature is represented in the State Senate by Patrick J. Diegnan (D, South Plainfield) and in the General Assembly by Robert Karabinchak (D, Edison) and Sterley Stanley (D, East Brunswick).

Middlesex County is governed by a Board of County Commissioners, whose seven members are elected at-large on a partisan basis to serve three-year terms of office on a staggered basis, with either two or three seats coming up for election each year as part of the November general election. At an annual reorganization meeting held in January, the board selects from among its members a commissioner director and deputy director. As of 2025, Middlesex County's Commissioners (with party affiliation, term-end year, and residence listed in parentheses) are:

Director Ronald G. Rios (D, Carteret, 2027), Deputy Director Shanti Narra (D, North Brunswick, 2027), Claribel A. "Clary" Azcona-Barber (D, New Brunswick, 2025), Charles Kenny (D, Woodbridge Township, 2025), Leslie Koppel (D, Monroe Township, 2026), Chanelle Scott McCullum (D, Piscataway, 2025) and Charles E. Tomaro (D, Edison, 2026).

Constitutional officers are: Clerk Nancy Pinkin (D, 2025, East Brunswick), Sheriff Mildred S. Scott (D, 2025, Piscataway) and Surrogate Claribel Cortes (D, 2026; North Brunswick).

=== Politics ===
As of March 23, 2011, there were a total of 9,520 registered voters in Metuchen, of which 4,120 (43.3%) were registered as Democrats, 1,528 (16.1%) were registered as Republicans and 3,858 (40.5%) were registered as Unaffiliated. There were 14 voters registered as Libertarians or Greens.

United States presidential election results for Metuchen
Year	Republican		Democratic		Third party(ies)	
Year	No.	%	No.	%	No.	%
2024	2,578	31.29%	5,468	66.37%	193	2.34%
2020	2,548	29.46%	5,953	68.84%	147	1.70%
2016	2,407	32.58%	4,664	63.14%	316	4.28%
2012	2,618	37.43%	4,286	61.28%	90	1.29%
2008	2,900	38.52%	4,554	60.49%	74	0.98%
2004	2,914	40.78%	4,152	58.10%	80	1.12%
2000	2,478	38.02%	3,713	56.97%	326	5.00%

In the 2012 presidential election, Democrat Barack Obama received 61.3% of the vote (4,286 cast), ahead of Republican Mitt Romney with 37.4% (2,618 votes), and other candidates with 1.3% (90 votes), among the 7,049 ballots cast by the borough's 9,779 registered voters (55 ballots were spoiled), for a turnout of 72.1%. In the 2008 presidential election, Democrat Barack Obama received 60.1% of the vote (4,554 cast), ahead of Republican John McCain with 38.3% (2,900 votes) and other candidates with 1.0% (74 votes), among the 7,579 ballots cast by the borough's 9,809 registered voters, for a turnout of 77.3%. In the 2004 presidential election, Democrat John Kerry received 57.9% of the vote (4,152 ballots cast), outpolling Republican George W. Bush with 40.6% (2,914 votes) and other candidates with 0.9% (80 votes), among the 7,170 ballots cast by the borough's 9,348 registered voters, for a turnout percentage of 76.7.

Gubernatorial election results for Metuchen
Year	Republican		Democratic		Third party(ies)	
Year	No.	%	No.	%	No.	%
2025	2,033	29.01%	4,942	70.51%	34	0.49%
2021	1,760	33.01%	3,505	65.74%	67	1.26%
2017	1,605	33.84%	2,994	63.12%	144	3.04%
2013	2,397	50.09%	2,319	48.46%	69	1.44%
2009	2,256	45.07%	2,281	45.57%	468	9.35%
2005	1,938	39.30%	2,791	56.60%	202	4.10%

In the 2013 gubernatorial election, Republican Chris Christie received 50.1% of the vote (2,397 cast), ahead of Democrat Barbara Buono with 48.5% (2,319 votes), and other candidates with 1.4% (69 votes), among the 4,844 ballots cast by the borough's 9,822 registered voters (59 ballots were spoiled), for a turnout of 49.3%. In the 2009 gubernatorial election, Democrat Jon Corzine received 47.0% of the vote (2,440 ballots cast), ahead of Republican Chris Christie with 43.4% (2,256 votes), Independent Chris Daggett with 8.2% (425 votes) and other candidates with 0.8% (43 votes), among the 5,197 ballots cast by the borough's 9,479 registered voters, yielding a 54.8% turnout.

United States Senate election results for Metuchen1
Year	Republican		Democratic		Third party(ies)	
Year	No.	%	No.	%	No.	%
2024	2,475	30.88%	5,359	66.87%	180	2.25%
2018	2,248	34.43%	4,073	62.38%	208	3.19%
2012	2,496	37.33%	4,056	60.66%	135	2.02%
2006	1,846	38.39%	2,809	58.42%	153	3.18%

United States Senate election results for Metuchen2
Year	Republican		Democratic		Third party(ies)	
Year	No.	%	No.	%	No.	%
2020	2,595	30.32%	5,797	67.72%	168	1.96%
2014	1,411	36.25%	2,435	62.56%	46	1.18%
2013	1,149	36.10%	2,004	62.96%	30	0.94%
2008	2,854	40.49%	4,055	57.53%	139	1.97%

== Education ==
=== Public schools ===
The Metuchen School District serves students in pre-kindergarten through twelfth grade. As of the 2019–20 school year, the district, comprised of four schools, had an enrollment of 2,300 students and 182.2 classroom teachers (on an FTE basis), for a student–teacher ratio of 12.6:1. Schools in the district (with 2019–20 enrollment data from the National Center for Education Statistics) are Mildred B. Moss Elementary School with 122 students in Pre-kindergarten and kindergarten, Campbell Elementary School with 702 students in grades 1–4, Edgar Middle School with 722 students in grades 5–8, and Metuchen High School with 729 students in grades 9–12.

Eighth grade students from all of Middlesex County are eligible to apply to attend the high school programs offered by the Middlesex County Magnet Schools, a county-wide vocational school district that offers full-time career and technical education at its schools in East Brunswick, Edison, Perth Amboy, Piscataway and Woodbridge Township, with no tuition charged to students for attendance.

There have been two historical schools named for Benjamin Franklin. The Old Franklin Schoolhouse is a one-room school on Route 27 (Middlesex Avenue) near Main Street built in 1807 and used until 1870. In 1906, it was acquired and restored by the Borough Improvement League and is currently used as a community music venue. It was documented by the Historic American Buildings Survey in 1942 and given a Certification of Eligibility for the New Jersey and National Registers of Historic Places in 1990. In 2017, the Schoolhouse was listed in the New Jersey and National Registers as a Key Contributing Site in the Middlesex Avenue-Woodwild Park Historic District. A larger Franklin School, built in 1909, once stood at the intersection of Middlesex and Lake Avenues but fell into disrepair in the mid-1980s. It was demolished in 1999 to make way for a residential development called Franklin Square.

=== Private schools ===
The borough is home to St. Joseph High School, a private all-boys Catholic prep school, notable for its academics and sports awards, that is conducted by the Brothers of the Sacred Heart and operated under the supervision of the Roman Catholic Diocese of Metuchen. Saint Francis Cathedral School, a Pre-K–8 school that is also part of the Roman Catholic Diocese of Metuchen, was one of eight private schools recognized in 2017 as an Exemplary High Performing School by the National Blue Ribbon Schools Program of the United States Department of Education.

== Historic district ==
- Middlesex Avenue–Woodwild Park Historic District
- U.S. National Register of Historic Places
- U.S. Historic district
- New Jersey Register of Historic Places
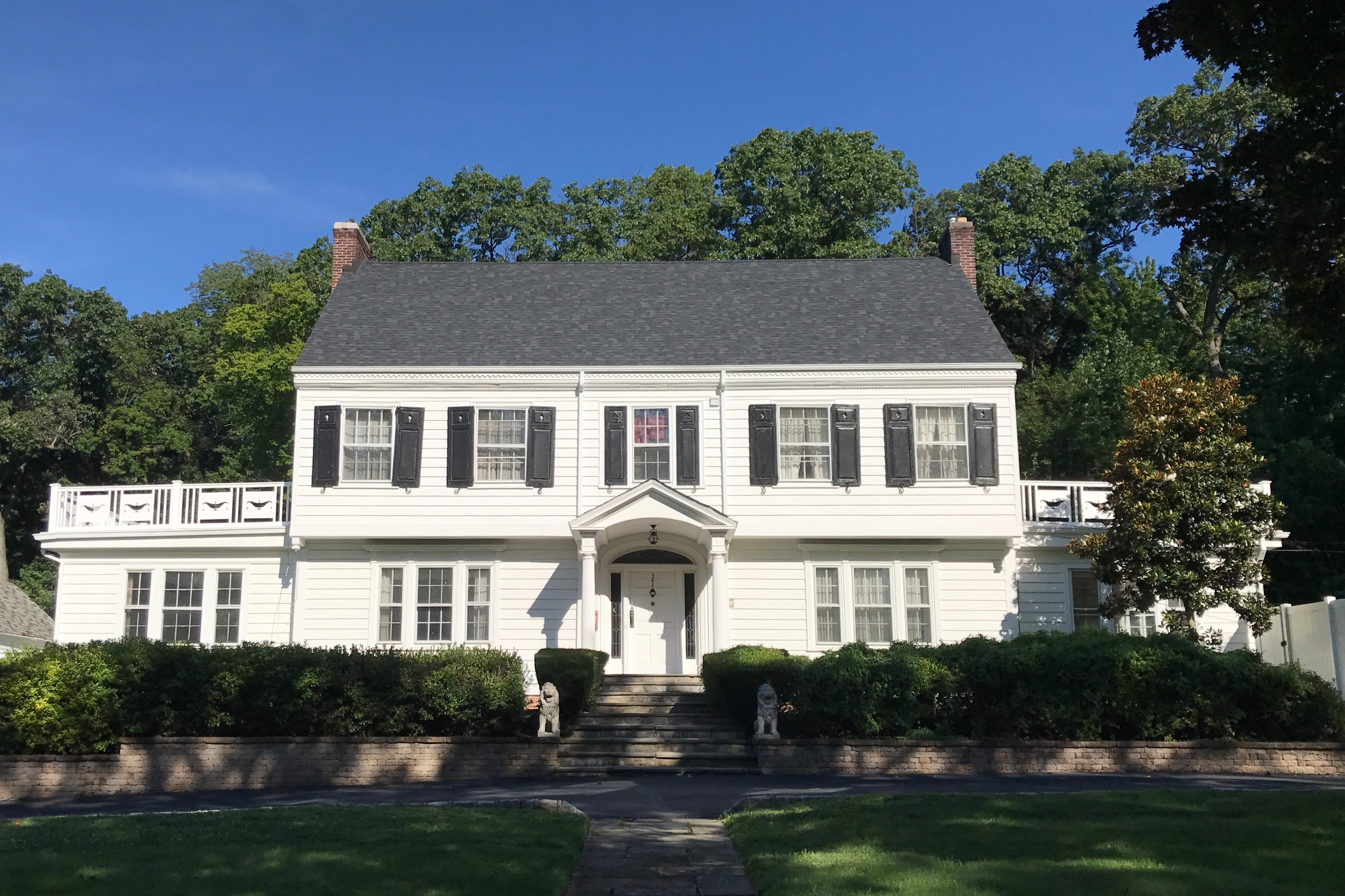
- 344 Middlesex Avenue, the Applegate House

- Location within Middlesex County, New Jersey Location within New Jersey Location within the United States
- Location: Middlesex Avenue and surrounding streets Metuchen, New Jersey
- Area: 88.9 acres (36.0 ha)
- Architectural style: Colonial Revival, Tudor Revival, Mission, Bungalow/Craftsman, Gothic, Queen Anne, Italianate, Greek Revival
- NRHP reference No.: 100001396
- NJRHP No.: 5349

Significant dates
- Added to NRHP: July 31, 2017
- Designated NJRHP: June 5, 2017

The Middlesex Avenue–Woodwild Park Historic District is a historic district located in Metuchen. It was added onto the National Register of Historic Places on July 31, 2017. It includes 197 contributing buildings, five contributing objects, and one contributing site.

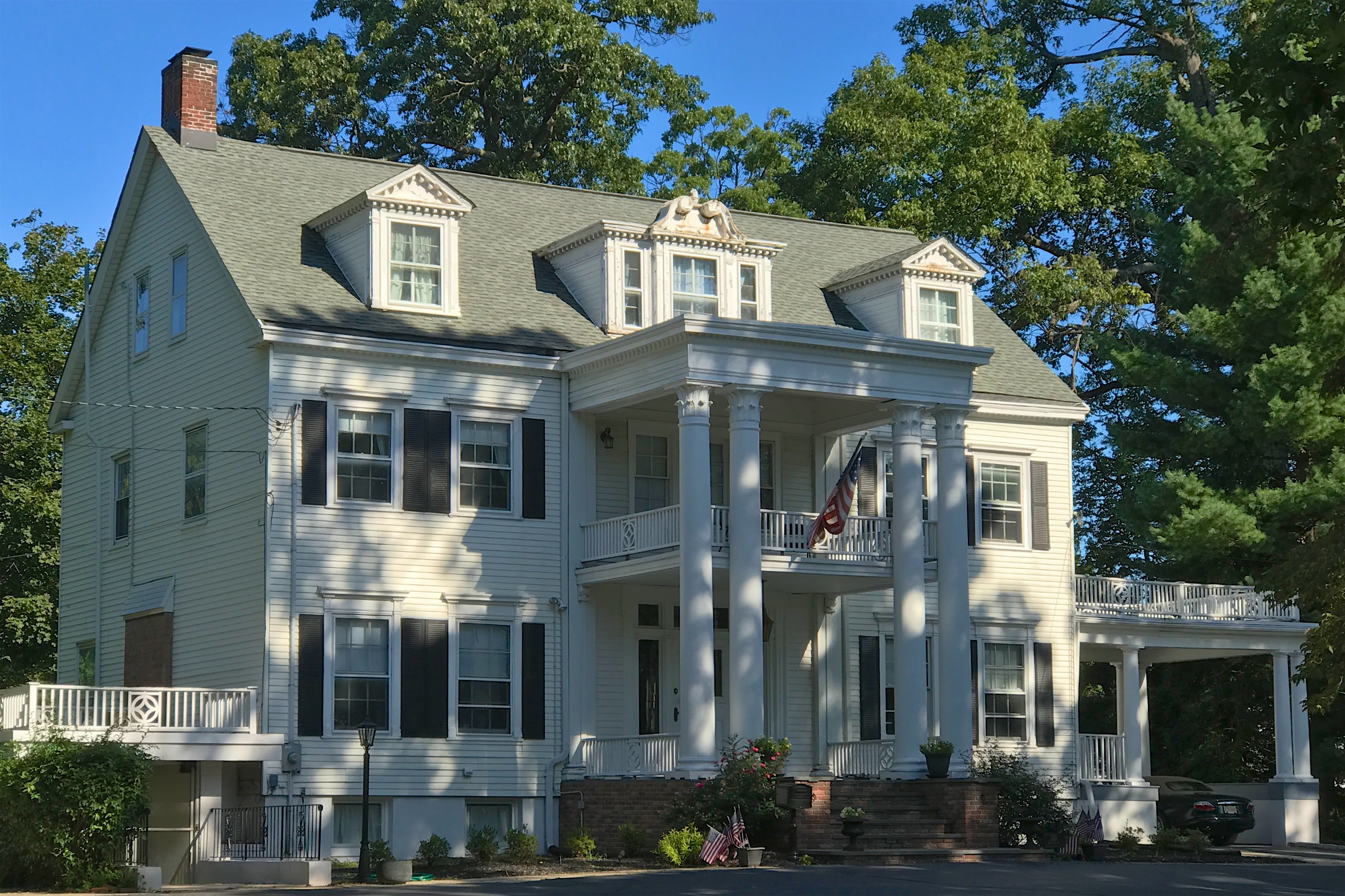
300 Middlesex Avenue
The Corbin House

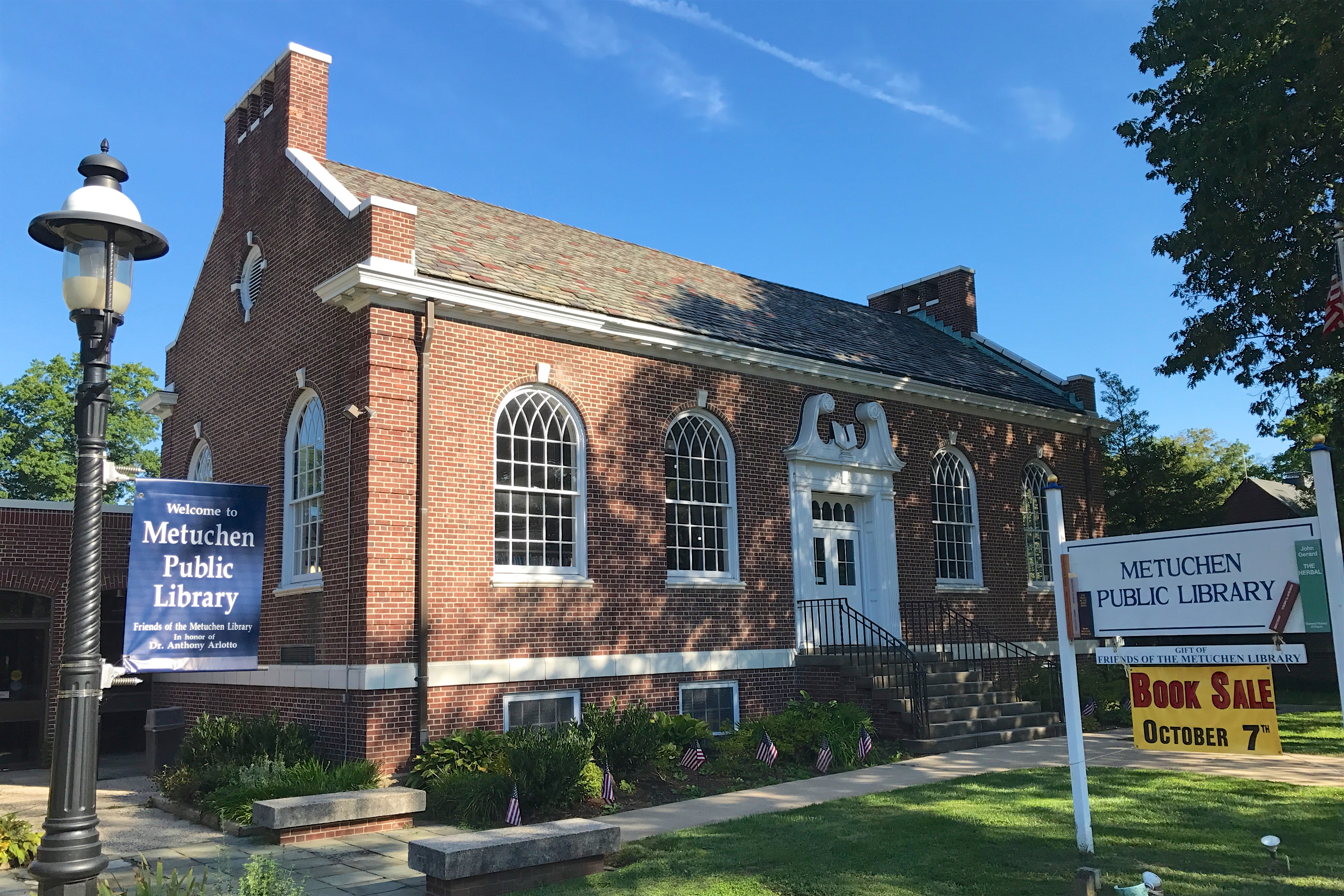
480 Middlesex Avenue
Metuchen Public Library

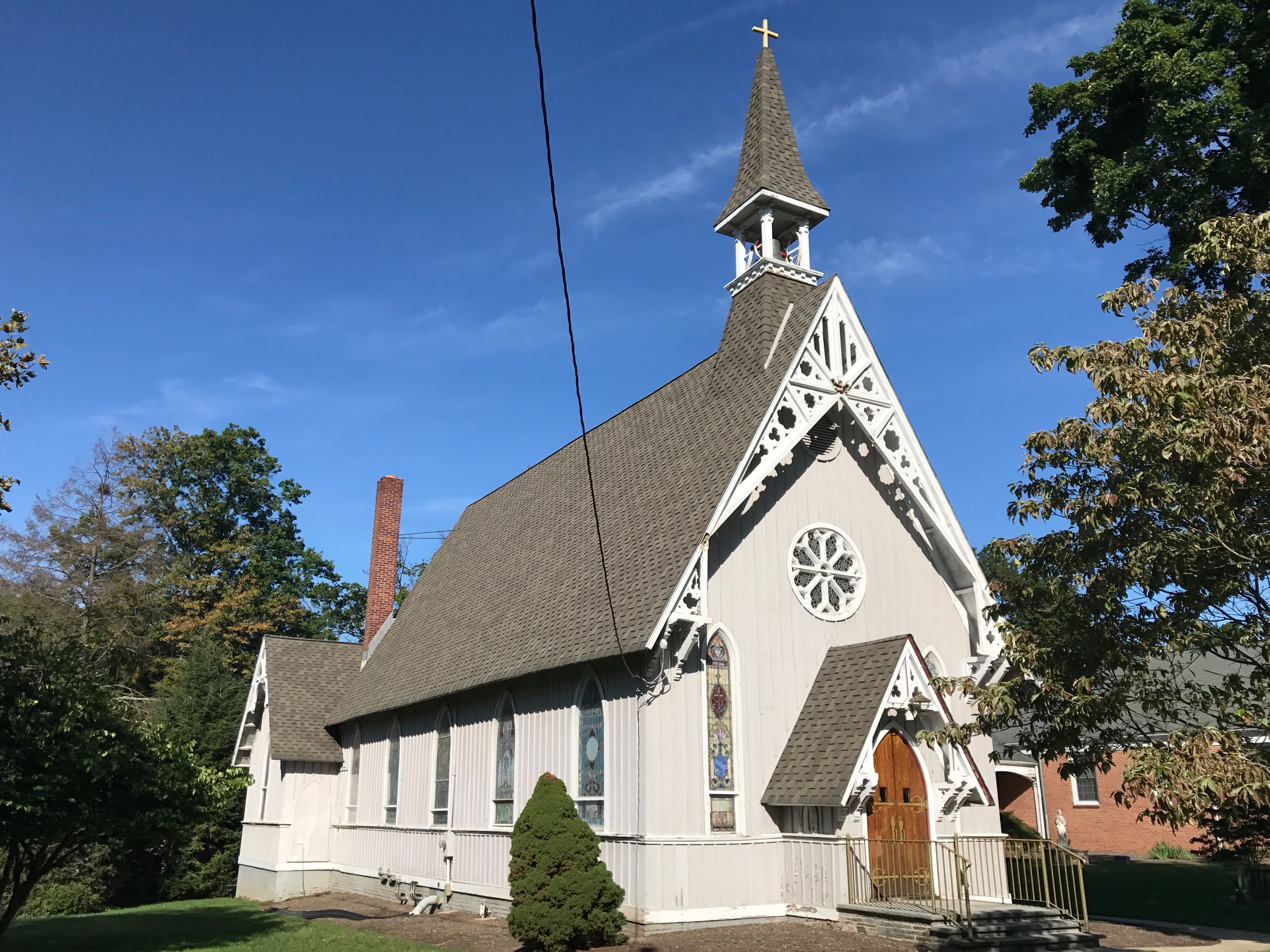
17 Oak Avenue
St. Luke's Episcopal Church

== Transportation ==
Commuting had become a way of life for Metuchen residents by the start of the 20th century. Daily commuters numbered 400 out of a population of 1,786 by the year 1900. Accessibility to New York City and New Brunswick enhanced the borough's reputation as a place to live, and the modern suburban ideal of small-town life where tired businessmen could escape the pace of the city grew in popularity.

=== Roads and highways ===
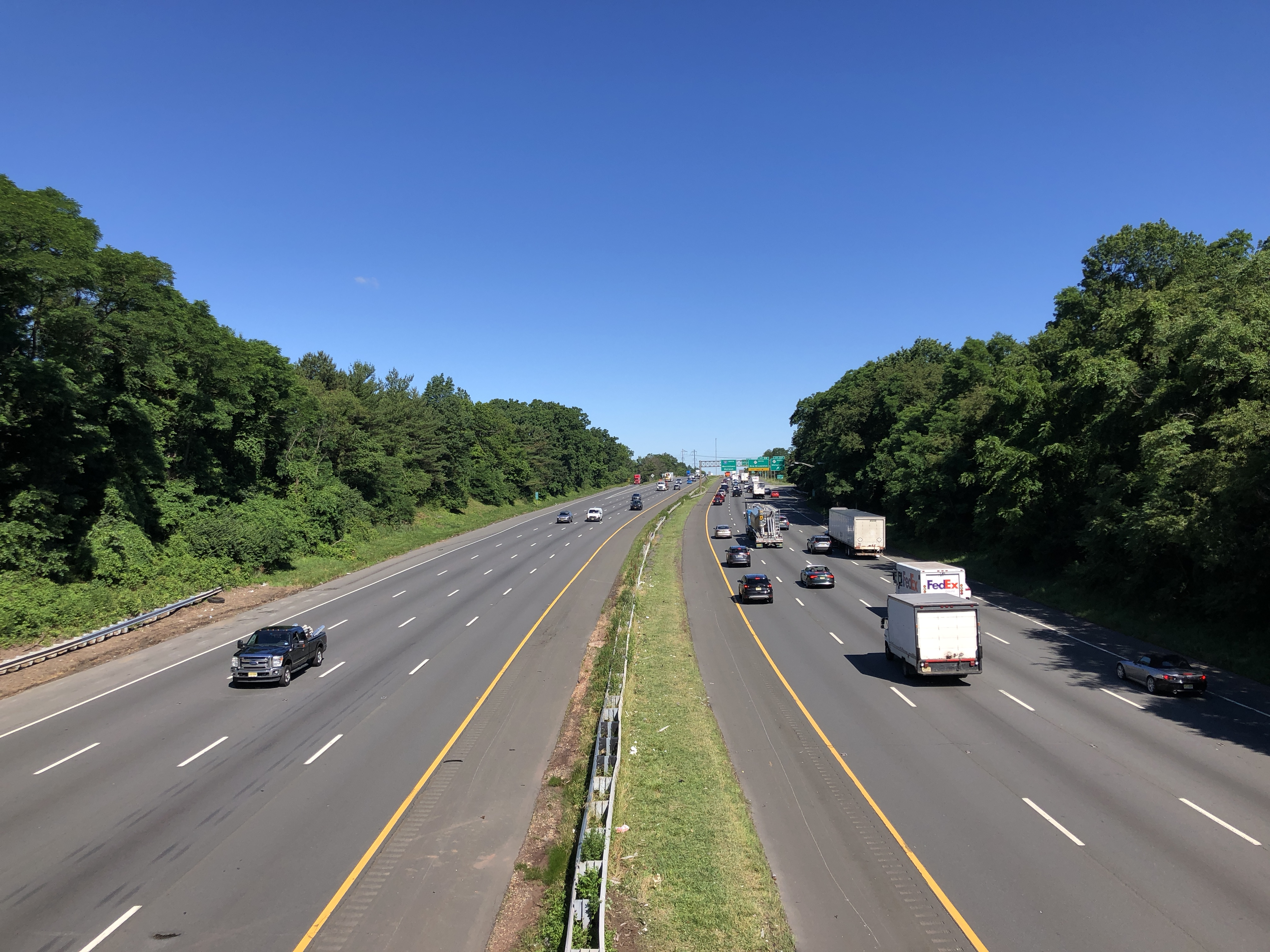
View northbound along I-287 on the south edge of Metuchen

As of May 2010, the borough had a total of 47.06 miles (75.74 km) of roadways, of which 38.91 miles (62.62 km) were maintained by the municipality, 5.73 miles (9.22 km) by Middlesex County and 2.42 miles (3.89 km) by the New Jersey Department of Transportation.

The biggest change to affect Metuchen between the World Wars was the rise of the automobile. In the 1920s, service stations were built, and the construction of U.S. Route 1 just south of Metuchen in 1930 diverted traffic away from Middlesex Avenue, helping the borough retain its residential character.

Both Route 27 and County Route 531 pass through and intersect at the heart of the borough, while Interstate 287 runs along the southern border. Metuchen also includes portions of County Route 501, as well as County Routes 660 and 669.

Other limited access roads are nearby, such as the New Jersey Turnpike (Interstate 95) in surrounding Edison Township and the Garden State Parkway in Woodbridge Township.

=== Public transportation ===
Commuter train service is provided by NJ Transit at the Metuchen station. Service is provided along the Northeast Corridor Line between the Trenton Transit Center and New York Penn Station.

NJ Transit local bus service is available on the 810, 813 and 819 routes.

== Notable people ==
People who were born in, residents of, or otherwise closely associated with Metuchen include:

- Joy M. Bergelson (born 1962), professor of genomics at New York University
- Marqus Blakely (born 1988), two-time America East Men's Basketball Player of the Year, winner of 2010 slam dunk contest
- Charles Brown (1946–2004), actor
- Henry T. Brown (1932–2020), chemical engineer who was the first African American in borough government
- Edward T. Buckingham (1874–1942), politician who served as Mayor of Bridgeport, Connecticut, from 1909 to 1911 and from 1929 to 1933
- Barbara Buono (born 1953), New Jersey State Senator
- John Ciardi (1916–1986), poet
- Lewis Compton (1892–1942), Assistant Secretary of the Navy, member of Metuchen Council
- David Copperfield (born 1956), magician and illusionist
- Scott Cowen (born 1946), president of Tulane University
- Paula Danziger (1944–2004), children's author who wrote more than 30 books, including her 1974 debut young adult novel, The Cat Ate My Gymsuit
- Betsy Dunn, politician who served in the Vermont House of Representatives from 2017 to 2019
- Bernard J. Dwyer (1921–1998), politician, who served in the United States House of Representatives from New Jersey from 1981 to 1993
- Kristen Edmonds (born 1987), soccer player
- Gail Fisher (1935–2000), first black actress to win an Emmy
- James Florio (1937-2022), Governor of New Jersey from 1990 to 1994
- Lucinda Florio (1947–2022), teacher and advocate for education and literacy, First Lady of New Jersey (1990–1994)
- Mary Eleanor Wilkins Freeman (1852–1930), author and novelist
- James Freis (born 1970), global fraud expert and former director of the Financial Crimes Enforcement Network
- Samuel L. Greitzer (1905–1988), mathematician who was founding chairman of the United States of America Mathematical Olympiad
- Robert Hegyes (1951–2012), actor who played the character "Epstein" in the 1970s TV series Welcome Back, Kotter
- Cecelia Holland (born 1943), historical novelist
- Elie Honig (born 1977), attorney and CNN senior legal analyst
- Ed Kalegi (born 1967), voice actor, radio personality, host and actor
- Robert Kaplow (born c. 1954), teacher and novelist whose coming-of-age novel was made into a film titled Me and Orson Welles
- Mary Ann Knowles (1946–2017), politician who served in the New Hampshire House of Representatives
- Jerome H. Lemelson (1923–1997), inventor and holder of more than 550 patents
- KC Navarro (born 1999), professional wrestler with Total Nonstop Action Wrestling
- Lonny Price (born 1959), actor, writer and director
- Thomas Mundy Peterson (1824–1904), first African-American to vote in an election under the just-enacted provisions of the 15th Amendment to the United States Constitution
- Hester Martha Poole (1833–1932), writer, poet, art critic, artist, and an advocate for women's rights
- Matt Popino (born c. 1991), college football coach, who has been the head football coach for Carthage College since 2024
- Brian Ralph (born 1973), alternative cartoonist, whose graphic novel, Daybreak, was adapted for the Netflix series Daybreak
- Nancy A. Roseman, 28th president of Dickinson College
- Tom Ruegger (born 1955/1956), animator, screenwriter, storyboard artist and lyricist, who created Animaniacs and Histeria!
- Quinn Shephard (born 1995), actress, writer, director and producer, whose directorial debut film Blame was shot in Metuchen
- Robert Taub (born 1955), concert pianist, recording artist, scholar, author and entrepreneur
- Karl-Anthony Towns (born 1995), NBA All-Star, currently playing for the New York Knicks
- Jack Waldman (1952–1986), jazz and rock musician, composer, producer, vocalist and multi-instrumentalist
- Marvin Webster (1952–2009), former professional basketball player who spent half his NBA career with the New York Knicks
- Richard Wenk (born 1956), screenwriter and director best known for his work on The Expendables 2 (2012), The Equalizer (2014), and The Magnificent Seven (2016)
- Julian E. Zelizer (born 1969), author and professor of political history at Princeton University
