= History of Rutgers University =

Rutgers University (officially known as Rutgers, The State University of New Jersey) is an institution of higher learning with campuses across the State of New Jersey: its main flagship campus in New Brunswick and Piscataway, and two other campuses in the cities of Newark and Camden, New Jersey.

The eighth of nine colleges established during the American colonial period, Rutgers was chartered as Queen's College on 10 November 1766. It was renamed Rutgers College in 1825 after Colonel Henry Rutgers (1745–1830), an American Revolutionary War hero, philanthropist, and an early benefactor of the school. With the development of graduated education, Rutgers College was renamed Rutgers University in 1924. Originally established as a private institution affiliated with the Dutch Reformed Church, it is now a secular institution and became the state university of New Jersey under legislation passed in 1945 and 1956. At present, Rutgers is unique as the only university in the United States that is a colonial chartered college (1766), a land-grant institution (1864), and a state university (1945/1956).

== History ==
=== Early history and conception ===
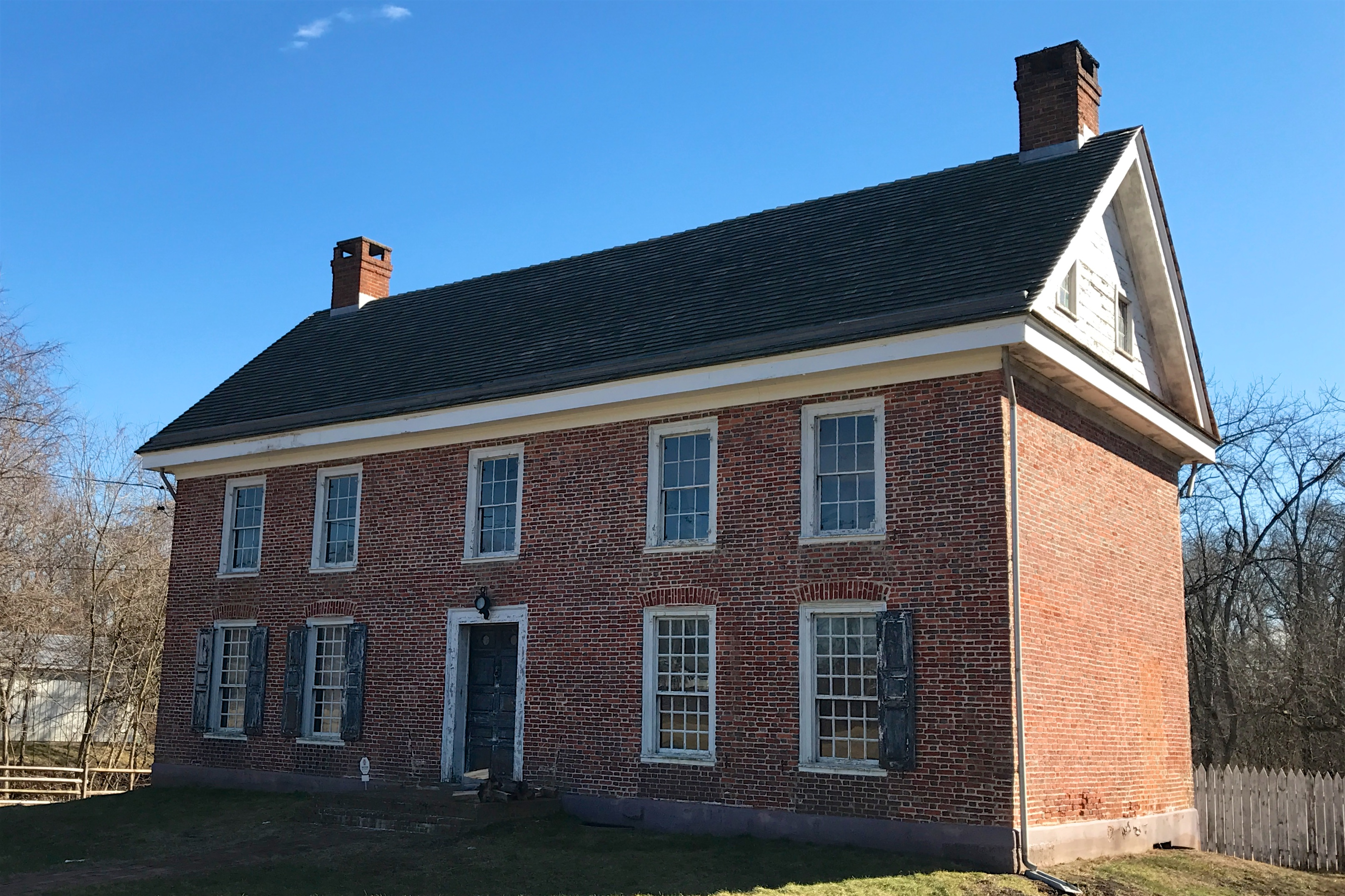
Jacob Rutsen Hardenbergh and Theodorus Frelinghuysen's son John lived in this building, known as the Old Dutch Parsonage, in Somerville, New Jersey.

Shortly after the creation of the College of New Jersey (later Princeton University) by Presbyterians in 1746, ministers of the Dutch Reformed Church sought to establish autonomy in ecclesiastical affairs. At that time, those who wanted to become ministers within the church had to travel to the Netherlands to be trained and ordained, and many of the affairs of churches in the American colonies were managed from Europe. Thus, the ministers sought to create a governing body known as a classis to give local autonomy to the church in the colonies.

The Great Awakening of the 18th century helped to bring about conditions that lead to wanting the aforesaid autonomy and led to the formation of Queen's College. Due to this, scholars such as Benjamin Justice and Thomas J. Frusciano called Queen's College "Child of the Awakening" in their sub-heading for their chapter for the book Rutgers: A 250th Anniversary Portrait. The conflict created by this movement allowed for men like Theodorus Jacobus Frelinghuysen to call for independence from the classis of Amsterdam. Protestant churches such as the Dutch Reformed Church wanted independence in order to offer opportunities for the education of ministers in the colonies without sending them on a long, expensive and difficult trip to Europe. More ministers were needed, ironically, as churches grew as a result of the Great Awakening.

So throughout the 1750s, Dutch ministers joined the effort to create a classis in the colonies, including Theodorus Jacobus Frelinghuysen II (son of the aforesaid Theodorus Jacobus Frelinghuysen) who traveled on horseback in winter of 1755 to several congregations throughout the northeast to rally ministers and congregations to the cause. Soon after, Frelinghuysen traveled to the Netherlands to appeal to the General Synod, the Dutch Reformed Church's governing council, for the creation of the classis. In 1761, the effort having failed, Frelinghuysen set sail for the colonies, but as his vessel approached New York City he mysteriously perished at sea.

After Frelinghuysen's death, Jacob Rutsen Hardenbergh (later Rutgers' first president) established himself as spokesperson for the cause, and a strong supporter of establishing a college in New Jersey. Hardenbergh traveled to Europe, renewing Frelinghuysen's efforts to gain the Synod's approval, but was also rejected. Hardenbergh then appealed to King George III of Great Britain, which further antagonized the authorities in Amsterdam. And on November 10, 1766, William Franklin, royal governor of New Jersey, granted a charter for Queen's College, with many prominent men supporting this new institution.

Many of the present day buildings were named after these men. This includes men such as John Hardenburgh (the first president), John Henry Livingston (1810–1824 president), the Reverend (Phillip Milledoler (Rutgers president, 1824–40) Henry Rutgers (whom eventually the college was named after), and Theodore Frelinghuysen.

Many early trustees of Queen's College gained wealth through their participation in the transatlantic slave trade and exploiting slave labor. These slaveholding trustees included Philip Livingston, Robert Livingston, Frederick Frelinghuysen, Jacob Hardenbergh, Theodorus Van Wyck, Peter Schenck, Abraham Hasbrouck, Jacob Dunham, John Schuneman, and Philip French. This also included Colonel Johannes Hardenbergh and Charles Hardenbergh, who owned Sojourner Truth and her parents, Bomefree and Mau-Mau Bett, among other slaves.

Some of the college's earliest students also came from the prominent slaveholding families of the area, including the Schencks, Van Cortlandts, Van Hornes, and the Parkers. The Parker Family owned slaves up until the 1820s, when they last manumitted a 35-year-old woman named Charlotte, and a 23-year-old man named Edward.

The college also received substantial donations of land and money from slaveholders, including James Parker, John Neilson, James Neilson, Elias Van Bunschooten, and Henry Rutgers. James Neilson owned “Negro Jack” and “Negro Sampson" according to his will. Reverend Simeon Van Artsdalen owned "black Toney and his wife Peg" and their two children, who were unnamed in his will. Peter Vredenburgh owned Tom and Margaret, and James Schureman owned Jane and Anthony, as listed in their wills.

=== Queen's College ===
The school now called Rutgers, The State University of New Jersey, was chartered on November 10, 1766, as "the trustees of Queen's College, in New-Jersey" in honor of King George III's Queen-consort, Charlotte of Mecklenburg-Strelitz (1744–1818). The charter was signed and the young college was supported by William Franklin (1730–1813), the last Royal Governor of New Jersey and illegitimate son of Benjamin Franklin. The original charter specified the establishment both of the college, and of an institution called the Queen's College Grammar School, intended to be a preparatory school affiliated and governed by the college. This institution, today the Rutgers Preparatory School, was a part of the college community until 1957.

The original purpose of Queen's College was to "educate the youth in language, liberal, the divinity, and useful arts and sciences" and for the training of future ministers for the Dutch Reformed Church—though the university is now non-sectarian and makes no religious demands on its students. In May 1771, the board of trustees voted 10 to 7 to establish the college at New Brunswick, selecting it over Hackensack, New Jersey. The Anglican population in New Brunswick supported the institution, thus receiving a royal charter for New Brunswick would be easier. The school admitted its first students in 1771—a single sophomore and a handful of first-year students taught by a lone instructor (Frederick Frelinghuysen) —and granted its first degree in 1774, to Matthew Leydt. After opening, the college chose to not accept Native American students into the college despite other universities allowing Native American students to attend their schools.

Despite the religious nature of the college, it first held classes at a tavern called the Sign of the Red Lion, located on the corner of Albany and Neilson streets on what is today the grounds of the Johnson & Johnson corporate headquarters in New Brunswick. When the Revolutionary War broke out, and taverns were suspected by the British as being hotbeds of rebel activity, the college abandoned the tavern and held classes in private houses, in and near New Brunswick.

In its early years, Queen's College was plagued by a lack of funds. In 1793, with the fledgling college falling on hard times, the board of trustees voted on a resolution to merge with the College of New Jersey (now Princeton University). The measure failed by one vote. The problem did not go away, and in 1795, lacking both funds and tutors, the trustees consider moving the college to New York. Instead, they decide to close, only to reopen in 1808 after the Trustees raised $12,000 (equivalent to $242,000 in 2025).

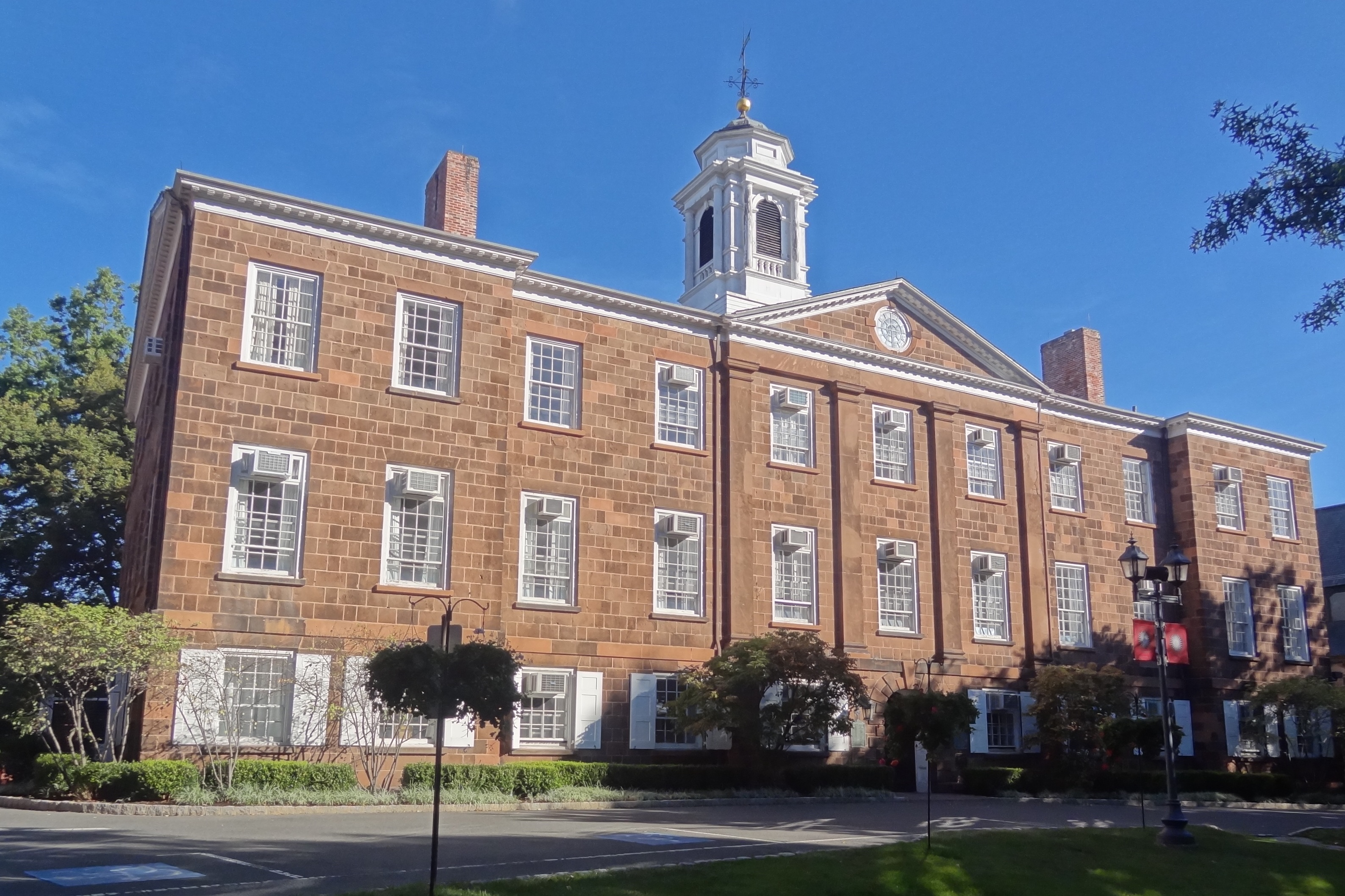
Old Queens, oldest extant building on campus

The next year, the college got a building of its own, affectionately called "Old Queens" (still standing), designed by the architect John McComb (who also designed City Hall in Manhattan), which is regarded today by architectural experts as one of the nation's finest examples of Federal architecture. The college's third president, the Rev. Ira Condict, laid the cornerstone on April 27, 1809. However, financial woes delayed completion of the building for 14 years.

The New Brunswick Theological Seminary, founded in 1784, relocated from Brooklyn, New York, to New Brunswick in 1810, and shared facilities with Queen's College (and the Queen's College Grammar School, as both were then under the oversight of the Reformed Church in America. During those formative years, all three institutions were fit into the Old Queens Building, then the only structure on campus. In 1815 Elias Van Bunschooten, at the end of his life, gave the college a gift of almost $19,000 (equivalent to $334,000 in 2025) in various forms. It was one of the largest financial donations made by an Old Queen's trustee at the time and helped the college ease some of the financial burden it was facing after being closed from 1795 to 1807. Donations such as his along with Andrew Kirkpatrick and Ira Condict helped save the college through the rough financial situation it was facing in the late 1790s and early 1800s. During its early years, the college developed as a classic liberal arts institution, and this development (coupled with both institutions' growing larger and resulting in overcrowding at the site), caused Rutgers College and the New Brunswick Theological Seminary to sever this arrangement. In 1856, the Seminary relocated to a seven-acre (28,000 m^{2}) tract less than one-half mile (800m) away. Both institutions maintain a close-knit relationship to this day, and the Seminary's Gardner Sage Library participates in the Rutgers University Library system.

Col. Henry Rutgers (1745–1830)

=== Under the Rutgers name ===
A nationwide economic depression, combined with effects from the War of 1812, forced Queen's College to close down a second time, in 1816. In 1825, Queen's College was reopened, and its name was changed to "Rutgers College" in honor of American Revolutionary War hero Colonel Henry Rutgers (1745–1830). According to the Board of Trustees, Colonel Rutgers was honored because he epitomized Christian values, the Colonel was a wealthy bachelor known for his philanthropy. A year after the school renamed itself, it received 2 donations from its namesake. Rutgers, a descendant of an old Dutch family that had settled in New Amsterdam (now New York City), gave the fledgling college a $200 bell that hangs from the cupola of the Old Queen's building; then later in 1826 he donated the interest on a $5,000 bond. This second donation finally gave the college the sound financial footing it had sorely needed. The college's early troubles inspired numerous student songs, including an adaptation of the drinking song Down Among the Dead Men, with the lyrics "Here's a toast to old Rutgers, loyal men/May she ne'er go down but to rise again."

Rutgers College became the land-grant college of New Jersey in 1864 under the Morrill Act of 1862 which gave federal aid to developing agricultural schools, resulting in the establishment of the Rutgers Scientific School, featuring departments of agriculture, engineering, and chemistry. The land given through the act was previously owned by the Lenni Lenape people which had been relocated to the West by this point. They were not consulted on the use of the land. Further expansion in the sciences came with the founding of the New Jersey Agricultural Experiment Station in 1880 and the division of the Rutgers Scientific School into the College of Engineering (now the School of Engineering) in 1914 and the College of Agriculture (now the School of Environmental and Biological Sciences) in 1921. The precursors to several other Rutgers divisions were also established during this period: the College of Pharmacy (now the Ernest Mario School of Pharmacy) in 1892, the New Jersey College for Women (now Douglass Residential College) in 1918, and the School of Education in 1924. Later, University College, founded to serve part-time, commuting students and Livingston College, emphasizing the urban experience, were created.

Aside from academics, the sport of college football is said to have its start at Rutgers. The 1869 New Jersey vs. Rutgers football game has been called the first American football game ever played. Rutgers won the game 6–4.

The first Summer Session began in 1913 with one six-week session. That summer program offered 47 courses and had an enrollment of 314 students. Currently, Summer Session offers over 1,000 courses to more than 15,000 students on the Camden, Newark, and New Brunswick/Piscataway campuses, off-campus, and abroad.

Rutgers College was renamed Rutgers University in 1924.

=== New Jersey's leading public university ===
Rutgers was designated the State University of New Jersey by acts of the New Jersey Legislature in 1945 and 1956. Before the 1956 law went into effect, the board of trustees voted to divest itself of the Rutgers Preparatory School, which became fully independent in 1957 and relocated to a campus on the Wells Estate (purchased from the Colgate-Palmolive Company) in nearby Somerset, New Jersey. Under the 1956 law, Rutgers was to be governed both by its Board of Trustees, chiefly an advisory body, charged also with maintaining the assets of the college and its continuity from the 1766 charter, as well as a Board of Governors consisting of eleven members: five members selected by the board of trustees, and six appointed by the governor of New Jersey.

Since the 1950s, Rutgers has continued to expand, especially in the area of graduate education. The Graduate School-New Brunswick, and professional schools have been established in such areas as business, management, public policy, social work, applied and professional psychology, the fine arts, and communication, information and library studies. number of these schools offer undergraduate programs as well.

In both 1947 and 1966, the College Avenue Gymnasium, built on the site of the first intercollegiate football game, hosted New Jersey's Constitutional Conventions.

A nationwide trend, caused mostly out of the civil rights and women's rights movements, caused many male-only colleges to alter their admissions policies to accept women and thus become coeducational. Rutgers, along with many of the older American institutions (including Princeton and Yale) became co-educational in the 1960s and 1970s. On September 10, 1970, after several years of debate and planning, the board of governors voted to admit women into the previously all-male Rutgers College. Today, Douglass Residential College (originally the New Jersey College for Women) remains all-female, while the rest of the university is coeducational.

In 2002, former Governor James E. McGreevey appointed a committee chaired by P. Roy Vagelos to explore the possibility of merging Rutgers University with the New Jersey Institute of Technology (NJIT) and the University of Medicine and Dentistry of New Jersey (UMDNJ). While this committee's report advocated such a merger, citing benefits such as increased power in applying for and receiving funds from medical, scientific and technological grant programs and corporate investment, this plan was unpopular with alumni, students, and faculty at these institutions and was misunderstood by the residents of New Jersey who were to vote on the proposal. Under mounting political pressure, Governor McGreevey withdrew plans for the merger.

In 2012, UMDNJ merged with Rutgers by act of the New Jersey state legislature, creating the Rutgers School of Biomedical and Health Sciences. In 2016, President Barack Obama spoke at the university commencement. The following year Steven Van Zandt was the commencement speaker and received an honorary doctorate in the fine arts.

In 2020, Jonathan Holloway was named as the 21st President of Rutgers University becoming the first Black president of Rutgers and the first Rutgers president to be a person of color.

In February 2021, the University announced an agreement between the Robert Wood Johnson Medical School and RWJBarnabas Health, the largest health network in New Jersey. The partnership integrated the school's clinical operations with RWJBH medical group facilities, effectively making every hospital in the health network a teaching hospital and creating one of the largest integrated health systems in the country. The agreement also included a major investment to the Rutgers Cancer Institute of New Jersey, including $750 million to construct a cancer pavilion in New Brunswick.

On April 9, 2023, three unions voted to go on the first strike in the university's 257 year history, citing the lack of progress on contract talks between union representatives and university officials. As a result, classes and research were suspended.

== See also ==
- Queens Campus
- Colonial colleges
- Lists of universities and colleges
- List of Rutgers University people
- History of New Jersey
- Public Ivy
- Rutgers University
