= Peithessophian Society =

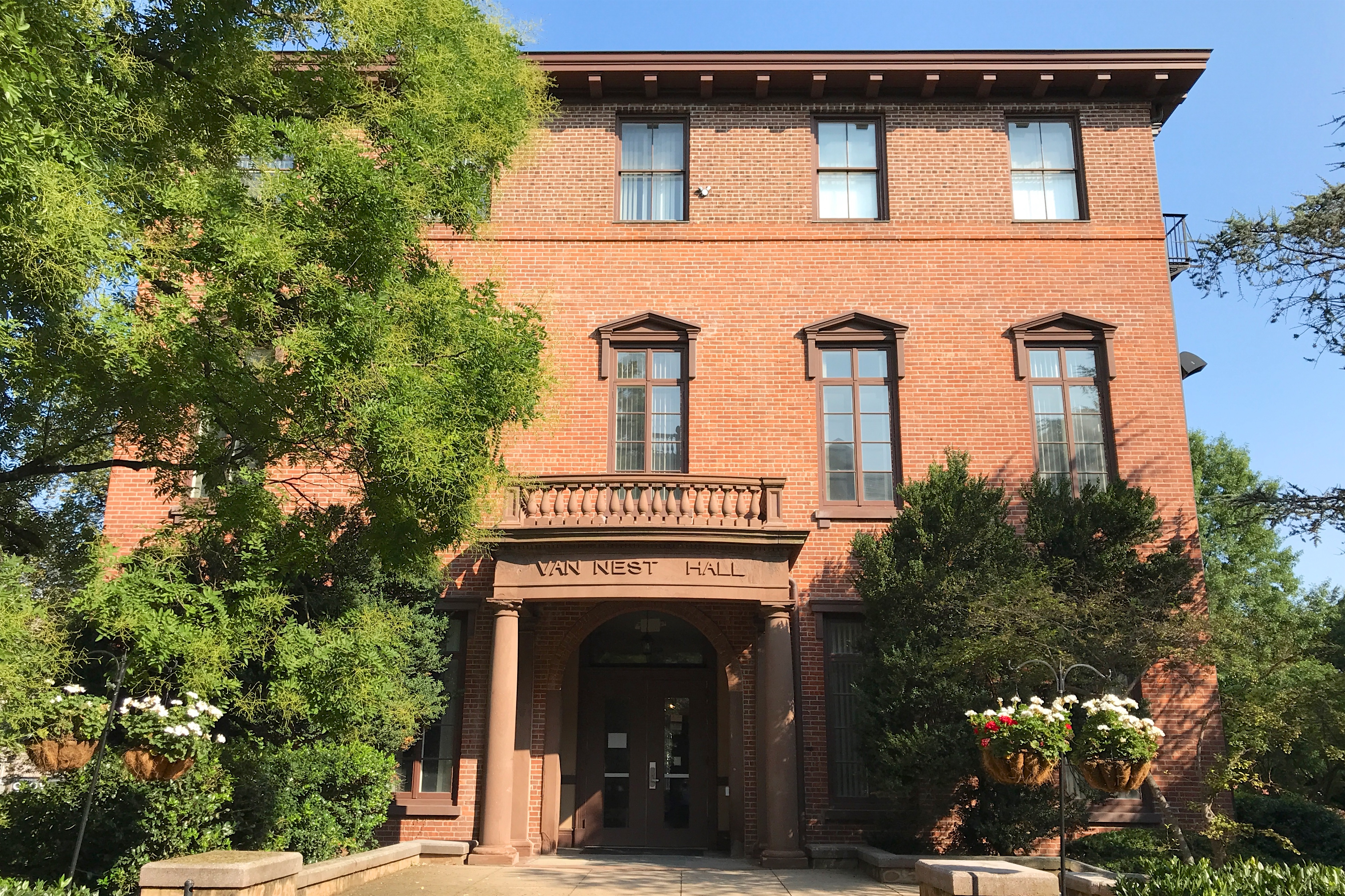
In the nineteenth century, Van Nest Hall housed the meeting rooms and libraries of the college's two rival literary and debating societies.

The Peithessophian Society of Rutgers College (or Peitho) was a student literary and debating society founded in 1825 at Rutgers College (later Rutgers University) in New Brunswick, New Jersey. Founded by Professor James Spencer Canon after Rutgers College reopened after years of financial difficulty and a brief closing, it was one of two such societies at campus in the nineteenth century—the other being the Philoclean Society. The name "Peithessophian" is derived from the Ancient Greek meaning "persuasiveness of wisdom."

According to Rutgers, the literary societies allowed students to develop "the skills of rhetoric and statesmanship that helped more fully utilize the classical education being taught in college classrooms. Rhetorical skills were honed through the writing of essays, orations before the society, and participation in debates. The societies also sought to increase their members exposure to literature by establishing private libraries that were often more diverse than that of the college."

In 1832 the society's library is recorded as holding 771 books, mostly literature (384 volumes), compared to the college's 1,290 titles which were largely theological texts. An 1876 survey by the U.S. Bureau of Education reported that Rutgers held 6,814 volumes in its college library and 3,800 in libraries of the Peithessophian Society and Philoclean Society.

The society first met in Old Queens, the oldest building on campus, but later moved to Alexander Johnston Hall, and later in 1848 to Van Nest Hall (built 1845) which it shared with Philoclean. On July 20, 1830, former U.S. Attorney General William Wirt delivered an address before Peithessophian and its rival Philoclean which foreshadowed the coming American Civil War. The address was popular in the nineteenth century and published also in France and Germany.

Membership declined after the Civil War and the latter half of the nineteenth century and the society ceased to meet in 1897. It was revived in the 1920s but then once again died out amidst the social turbulence associated with the Depression and World War II. In the late 1990s, having rediscovered the central role played by Peithessophian and Philoclean in the intellectual life of the college for more than three-quarters of a century, a small group of students began spontaneously to meet informally for regular debate and discussion. In 2008, Peithessophian would be formally reinstituted, with a membership of ten members and a revival of the original 19th-century induction ceremony held each May in Kirkpatrick Chapel. Among its induction speakers have been Yan Lipovetsky, first president of the reinstituted Society, and Professor William C. Dowling, its faculty advisor. Among the current objectives of the Peithessophian board of officers is a permanent allotment of college space, equivalent to its Van Nest library and meeting rooms in the nineteenth century, to the Society.

== See also ==
- Queens Campus
- History of Rutgers University
- Rutgers University student organizations
