= Alexander Johnston Hall =

- Rutgers Preparatory School
- U.S. National Register of Historic Places
- New Jersey Register of Historic Places
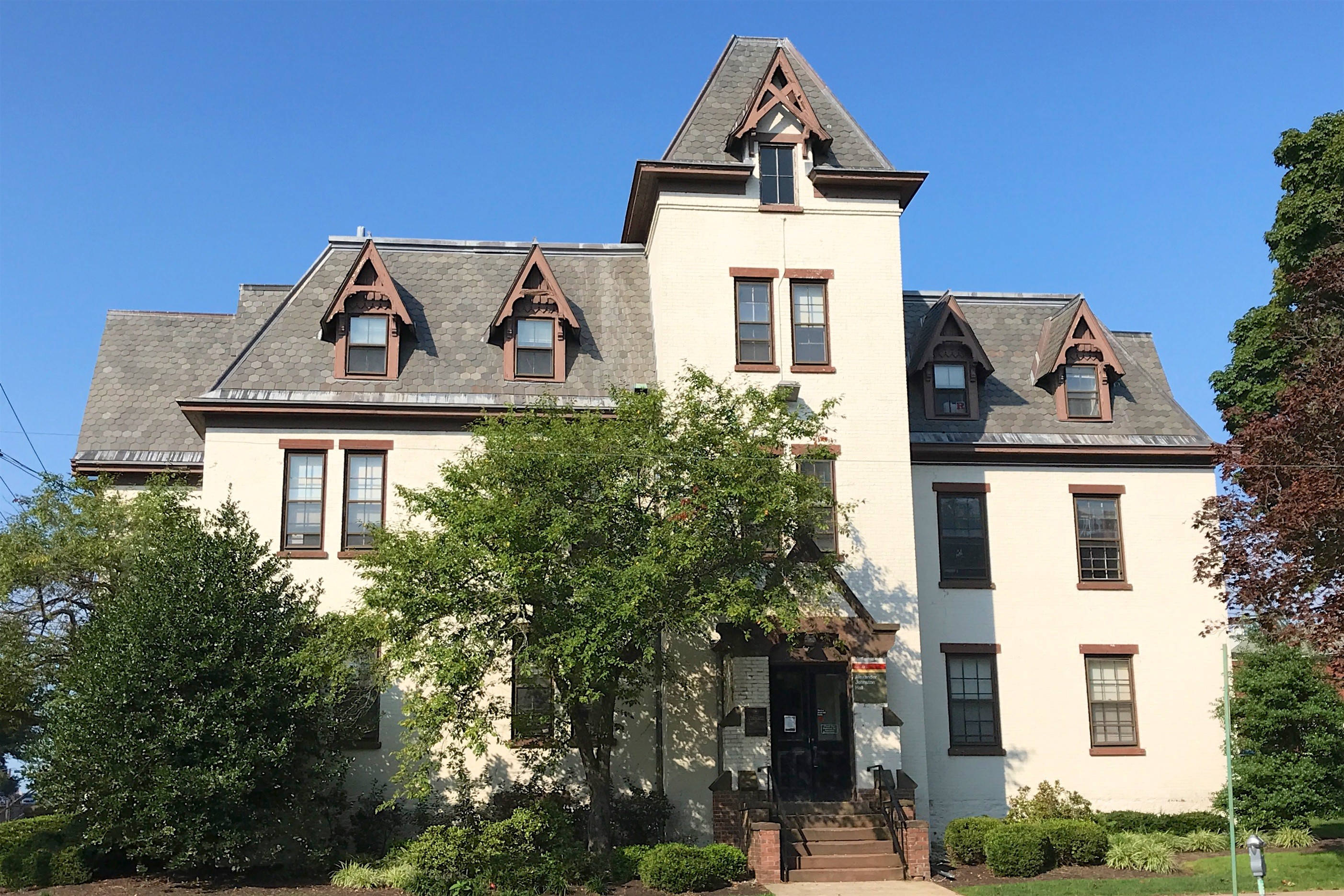
- Alexander Johnston Hall

- Location within Middlesex County, New Jersey Location within New Jersey Location within the United States
- Location: 101 Somerset Street, New Brunswick, New Jersey
- Coordinates: 40°29′52″N 74°26′50″W
- Area: 0.3 acres (0.12 ha)
- Built: 1830
- Architect: Nicholas Wyckoff; Henry Janeway Hardenbergh
- Architectural style: Second Empire, Italianate
- NRHP reference No.: 75001145
- NJRHP No.: 1882

Significant dates
- Added to NRHP: July 18, 1975
- Designated NJRHP: May 8, 1975

Alexander Johnston Hall is a historic building located on the corner of Somerset Street and College Avenue, New Brunswick in Middlesex County, New Jersey and is the second oldest building on the campus of Rutgers University. It was built in 1830 to handle the expansion of the Rutgers Preparatory School and the two literary societies, Philoclean and Peithessophian. The building, described using its historic name, Rutgers Preparatory School, was added to the National Register of Historic Places on July 18, 1975 for its significance in architecture and education.

== History ==
Designed by local architect and builder Nicholas Wyckoff in 1830, Alexander Johnston Hall served as the home of the Rutgers College Grammar School, later known as the Rutgers Preparatory School. In 1870, the Rutgers College trustees hired architect Henry Janeway Hardenbergh (1847–1918) to design a two-story addition for the building. It was the first of three commissions Hardenbergh designed for the college—the other two being Geology Hall (1872) and Kirkpatrick Chapel. The Rutgers Preparatory School used this building from 1830 to 1963. The school, which was chartered with Rutgers as "Queen's College" in 1766, is now an independent school located on a 45-acre campus on Easton Avenue in Somerset, New Jersey. In 1964, the university renamed the building to honor 1870 graduate, Alexander Johnston, a historian and classics instructor at the school. Johnston had taught future Rutgers president William H. S. Demarest here.

Historical information plaque

== See also ==
- Queens Campus
- Voorhees Mall
