= Alexander Johnston (historian) =

American lawyer

Alexander Johnston (died July 21, 1889) was an American historian.

== Biography ==
He was born in Brooklyn, New York. He studied at the Polytechnic Institute of Brooklyn, graduated from Rutgers College in 1870, and was admitted to the bar in 1875 in New Brunswick, New Jersey, where he taught in the Rutgers College Grammar School from 1876 to 1879.

He was principal of the Latin school of Norwalk, Connecticut, in 1879–1883, and was professor of jurisprudence and political economy in the College of New Jersey (Princeton University) from 1884 until his death in Princeton, New Jersey in 1889.

== Works ==
- A History of American Politics (1881)
- American Political History 1763-1876
- The Genesis of a New England State Connecticut (1883), in Johns Hopkins University Studies
- A History of the United States for Schools (1886)
- Connecticut (1887) in the American Commonwealths Series
- the article on the history of the United States for the 9th edition of the Encyclopædia Britannica, reprinted as The United States: Its History and Constitution (1887)
- a chapter on the history of American political parties in the seventh volume of Justin Winsor's Narrative and Critical History of America
- many articles on the history of American politics in Lalor's Cyclopaedia of Political Science, Political Economy, and Political History of the United States (1881–1884). 1899 Edition.

These last articles, which like his other writings represent much original research and are excellent examples of Johnston's rare talent for terse narrative and keen analysis and interpretation of facts, were republished in two volumes entitled American Political History 1763-–1876 (1905–1906), edited by Professor J. A. Woodburn.

== See also ==
- Alexander Johnston Hall
