= Jacob Rutsen Hardenbergh =

American politician (1735/36–1790)

The Reverend Jacob Rutsen Hardenbergh
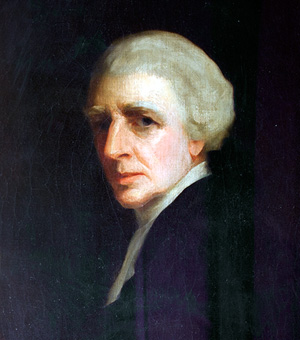

1st President of Rutgers University
- In office 1786–1790
- Succeeded by: William Linn

Personal details
- Born: 22 February 1736 Rosendale, New York
- Died: 30 October 1790 (aged 54) New Brunswick, New Jersey
- Cause of death: Tuberculosis
- Resting place: First Reformed Church Cemetery, New Brunswick, New Jersey
- Spouse: Dinah Van Bergh (m. 1756)
- Children: 9
- Occupation: Dutch Reformed clergyman

Jacob Rutsen Hardenbergh (22 February 1735/6 (Note: In the Julian calendar, then in use in England, the year began on 25 March. To avoid confusion with dates in the Gregorian calendar, then in use in other parts of Europe, dates between January and March were often written with both years. Dates in this article before 1752 are in the Julian calendar unless otherwise noted. See: Old Style and New Style dates) – 30 October 1790) was an American Dutch Reformed clergyman, colonial and state legislator, and educator. Hardenbergh was a founder of Queen's College—now Rutgers, The State University of New Jersey—in 1766, and was later appointed as the college's first president.

Hardenbergh was descended from a Dutch family that settled New Amsterdam in the seventeenth century and was prominent in New York colonial affairs. He prepared for ministry at the home of the Reverend John Frelinghuysen, a prominent Dutch Reformed minister near Somerville, New Jersey. After being ordained, Hardenbergh was called to serve congregations in New Jersey's Raritan River valley, and later in Ulster County, New York. During the 1760s, Hardenbergh was influential in the establishment of Queen's College, the eighth of nine colleges established during the colonial period. After his efforts to lobby Britain's King George III and New Jersey's royal governor, William Franklin to permit the establishment of a Dutch Reformed-affiliated college, Queen's College was chartered in 1766. During the American Revolution, Hardenbergh served as a delegate for New Jersey's Provincial Congress which ratified the Declaration of Independence and to frame the state's first constitution (1776). He subsequently served several successive one-year terms in New Jersey's General Assembly. In 1785, Hardenbergh was appointed as the first president of Queen's College, a post he would hold from 1786 to his death in 1790.

== Life and career ==
=== Early life and education ===
Jacob Rutsen Hardenbergh was born on 22 February 1735/36 at Rosendale near Kingston, Ulster County, New York in the Hudson River Valley. He was the son of Colonel Johannes Hardenbergh (1706–1786) and Maria DuBois (1705/06–1790). His brother was Colonel Johannes Hardenbergh Jr (1729–1799), who owned Sojourner Truth. His parents had married in Kingston on 6 December 1728 and seven children were born to the marriage of which Jacob was the fourth. His father, who later served with distinction as a field officer under Washington in the Continental Army, served in New York's Colonial Assembly. Frelinghuysen instructed Hardenbergh from his home, preserved as the Old Dutch Parsonage in Somerville, New Jersey.

Hardenbergh was the grandson of Johannes Hardenbergh, a wealthy landowner and prominent figure in New York colonial government, who was the owner of the colony's Hardenbergh Patent (1709), an immense tract of land that covered approximately 2,000,000 acres (8,100 km2) of the Catskill Mountains in what is now Sullivan, Ulster and Delaware counties in New York. He was likely named for his great-grandfather, Jacob Rutsen, whose daughter Catherine was the second wife of his paternal grandfather.

According to John Howard Raven and William H.S. Demarest, Hardenbergh obtained an education from the Kingston Academy, in Kingston, Ulster County, New York. However, the Kingston Academy was not established until 1773. Kingston did, however, have a small school with a Dutch schoolmaster founded in 1722 by the Trustees of the Freeholders and Commonality of the Town of Kingston—an organization chartered by colonial governor Thomas Dongan to provide for the free education of Kingston's children. In his late teens, he travelled to Somerset County, New Jersey to receive religious and theological instruction from the Reverend John Frelinghuysen, who was serving Dutch Reformed congregations in the Raritan valley of central New Jersey.

John Frelinghuysen died in 1754, and at the age of twenty, Hardenbergh married Frelinghuysen's widow, Dinah Van Bergh (c.1723–1807) on 18 March 1756 at Raritan, New Jersey. She had two children with Frelinghuysen before his death. Born in Amsterdam, Dinah was the daughter of Louis Van Bergh, a wealthy merchant who was "engaged in East India trade." Hardenbergh proposed as Dinah was strongly considering returning to the Netherlands with her two children. Her diary, dating from February 1746 to late 1747, is held by Special Collections and University Archives, at the Archibald S. Alexander Library of Rutgers University. Hardenbergh and his wife had nine children: Maria (born 1757–1789), Laura (born 1757–1785), Johannes (1759–1798), Elinor (born 1760), Dina (born 1762), Jacob Rutsen (1763–1764), Rachel (born 1765–1845), Jacob Rutsen (born 1768), and Lewis (1771–1810). Hardenbergh's step-son, Frederick Frelinghuysen (1753–1804), served in the Provincial Congress of New Jersey, state legislature, and was elected a United States Senator. He also served as a military officer in the Revolution and in the Whiskey Rebellion (1794) when he attained the rank of major general.

=== Career as a minister ===
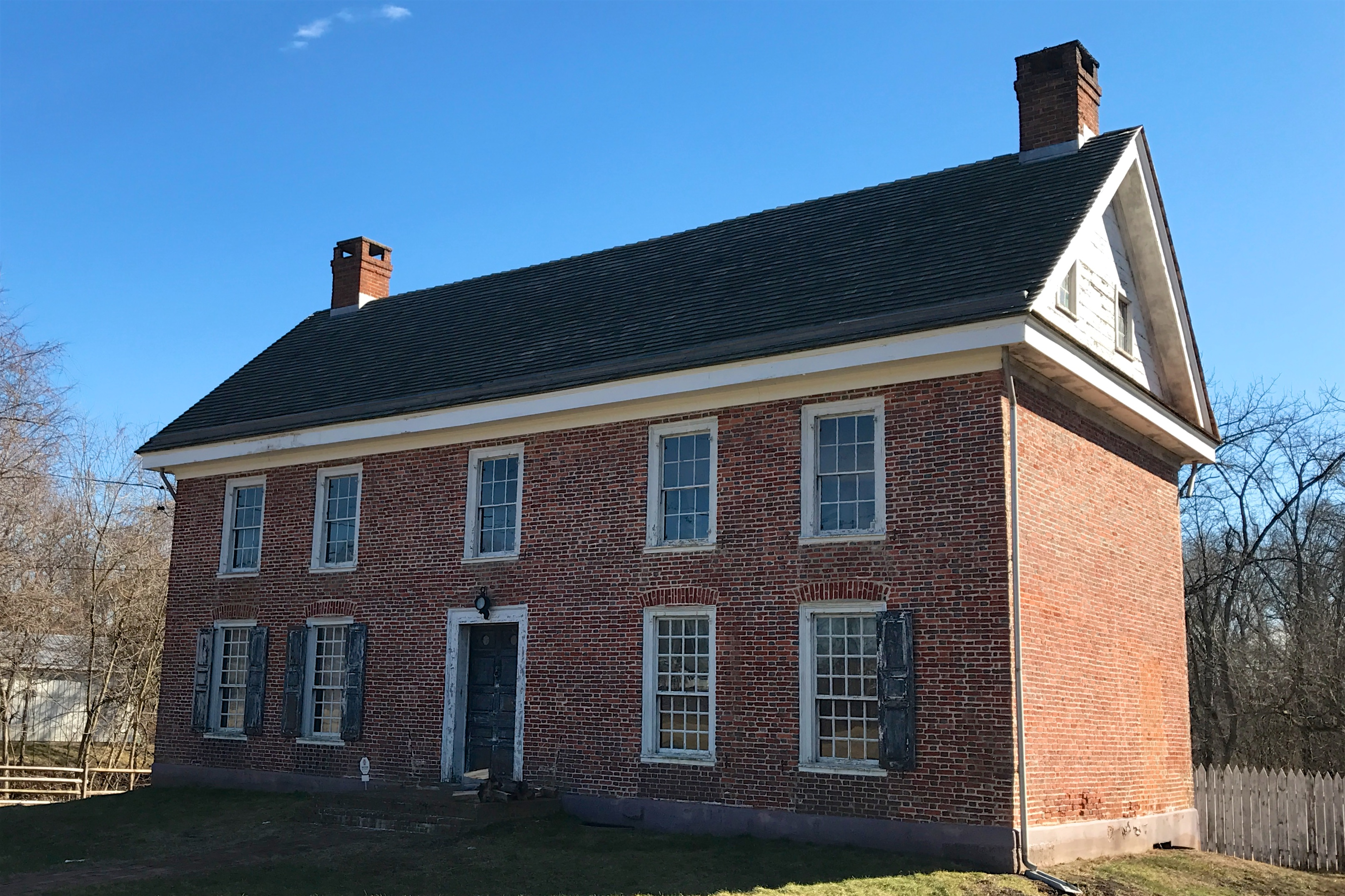
Hardenbergh lived in the Old Dutch Parsonage in Somerville for over 40 years, first as a theology student, then as local clergy, and while president of Queen's College.

Hardenbergh studied theology under the Reverend John Frelinghuysen, a Reformed clergyman who served several congregations located in the valley of the Raritan River in Somerset County, New Jersey, at the village of Raritan, Bedminster, Millstone, Neshanic, North Branch, and New Brunswick. These congregations had been served by Frelinghuysen's father, the Reverend Theodorus Jacobus Frelinghuysen (1691–1749), who rose to prominence during the First Great Awakening. The First Great Awakening was an evangelical revival in the 1730s and 1740s that revitalized Christian beliefs in Protestant Europe and the North American colonies through powerful preaching that gave listeners a sense of deep personal revelation of their need of salvation by Jesus Christ. Frelinghuysen had adapted the theological developments of the Puritan divines to preach a style of Reformed pietism, a revivalistic style of Calvinism. His son, John, preached and instructed his students in the same style.

With John Frelinghuysen's unexpected death in 1754, Hardenbergh, as his last theological student, assumed the pulpits of five congregations in central New Jersey served by his teacher. In 1757, Hardenbergh received a license to preach from the Coetus and was formally called by these congregations in May 1758. In 1761, the Coetus relieved him of two of these congregations, at Millstone and New Brunswick.

During the Revolution, General Washington, a personal friend of the Hardenbergh family, established a headquarters at Raritan in the home of John Wallace and frequently attended services sitting "at the head of the elder's pew". In 1779, the church at Raritan was burned by British forces under Colonel John Graves Simcoe who had intensified efforts to capture Washington. The church was not rebuilt until 1788.

In 1781, Hardenbergh resigned his pastorates in New Jersey to accept the call to congregations at Marbletown, Rochester, and Wawarsing in Ulster County, New York. He would serve these congregations until 1785. In October 1785, Hardenbergh was called to serve as pastor to the congregation at the First Reformed Church in New Brunswick, New Jersey. He would arrive in New Brunswick to assume the pastorate in April 1786. At the same time, the trustees of Queen's College had called Hardenbergh, a devoted trustee for the school, to serve as its first appointed president. Hardenbergh was invited to fill a vacancy left by the death of the Rev. Johannes Leydt (1719–1783). For two years the church had been served by neighboring clergymen. Hardenbergh had trained both of Leydt's sons in theology—Matthew Leydt (who also died in 1783) was the first graduate of Queen's College. He would serve the congregation until his sudden death in 1790. According to church historian, Richard Holloway Steele, Hardenbergh was the last pastor at New Brunswick to preach in Dutch.

On four occasions, Hardenbergh was selected to serve as the President of the General Synod of the Dutch Reformed Church.

=== Queen's College ===
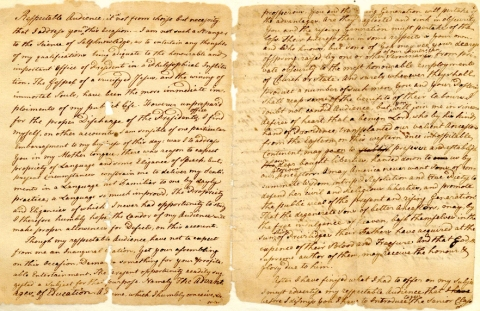
The handwritten draft of Hardenbergh's 1774 Queen's College commencement address

In 1763, he traveled to Europe and appealed to King George III of Great Britain on behalf of the proposal. On 10 November 1766, Royal Governor William Franklin chartered Queen's College.

Hardenbergh served as an early Trustee of the college, beginning with its first meeting in Hackensack on 12 May 1767, and during this time served in the capacity as board secretary until 1782. Hardenbergh's was named on both of the college's charters, the first in 1766 and the second in 1770. Hardenbergh's father served as a trustee from 1767 until 1786.

It is assumed that he served in a role administering the college's activities as early as 1770. His name appears as college president on the diploma conferred to Simeon DeWitt, a 1776 alumnus.

In 1785, the trustees invited the Reverend Dirck Romeyn to be the college's first appointed president but he declined. The trustees then appointed Hardenbergh. In 1789, ten students graduated from Queen's College.

=== Political career ===
During the American Revolution, Hardenbergh represented Somerset County as a delegate to the final session of New Jersey's Provincial Congress, a transitional legislative and governing body that met in Burlington, New Jersey from June to August 1776. This session ordered the arrest of the New Jersey colony's last royal governor, William Franklin, and began to transition the state from a crown colony into an independent state. The Provincial Congress subsequently ratified the Declaration of Independence and framed the first Constitution of the State of New Jersey (1776). Hardenbergh served several one-year terms in New Jersey's General Assembly.

== Death and legacy ==
Hardenbergh died on 30 October 1790 of tuberculosis in New Brunswick, New Jersey. He was interred in the churchyard of the First Reformed Church in New Brunswick. The inscription on his grave was written by the Reverend John Henry Livingston and exhorts mourners to "go walk in his virtuous footsteps; and when you have finished the work assigned you, you shall rest with him in eternal peace." It eulogises Hardenbergh as "a zealous preacher of the Gospel, and his life and conversation afforded, from his earliest days, to all who knew him, a bright example of real piety...a steady patriot, and in his public and private conduct he manifested himself to be the enemy of tyranny and oppression, the lover of freedom, and the friend of his country." At the time of his death, Hardenbergh was a wealthy man—largely due to monies and property inherited from his father and grandfather—and was the owner of 40,000 acres of land in Ulster County that was once part of his grandfather's patent.

Hardenbergh's great-great-grandson, architect Henry Janeway Hardenbergh (1847–1918) was hired by the trustees of Rutgers College to design three buildings for the campus—Geology Hall (1871–72), Kirkpatrick Chapel (1873), an addition to the grammar school (now Alexander Johnston Hall)—and to design Suydam Hall (demolished) on the former campus of the New Brunswick Theological Seminary, before a career designing large hotels and buildings in New York City. In Kirkpatrick Chapel, the large stained-glass window in the chancel above the altar, titled "Jesus, the Teacher of the Ages", was donated to the college by Henry Janeway Hardenbergh after the renovation of the chapel in 1916 and dedicated to his great-great-grandfather. This window is one of four in the chapel designed and crafted in the studios of Louis Comfort Tiffany (1848–1933).

His grandson, Cornelius Low Hardenbergh, served as the mayor of New Brunswick, New Jersey from 1829 to 1838. Cornelius's son, Augustus Albert Hardenbergh, served two separate terms as a United States Congressman from New Jersey, 1875 to 1879 and 1881 to 1883.

His great-grandson, Cornelius Abraham Jansen Hardenbergh (1826–1893), twice served as the Town Supervisor of Shawangunk, New York, from 1861 to 1867 and 1876 to 1882, then served in the New York State Assembly from 1885 to 1886. His second great-nephew, Jacob Hardenbergh, served as a New York State Senator from 1870 to 1872.

Hardenbergh Hall, a building on Rutgers University's College Avenue Campus in New Brunswick, New Jersey, was named in his honour. It provides classroom space in its lower floors, and undergraduate student housing for 330 students on its six upper floors. It is one of three residence halls known as the "River Halls" or "River Dorms" (the others being Frelinghuysen Hall and Campbell Hall) built in 1956 overlooking the Raritan River and located between New Brunswick's George Street and New Jersey Route 18.

== Primary sources ==
- Studdiford, Peter. A Funeral Sermon on the Death of Reverend Jacob R. Hardenbergh, D.D., President of Queens College and Pastor of the Dutch Church in new Brunswick. (New Brunswick, New Jersey: s.n., 1791), pamphlet.
