= Matthew Leydt =

American tutor & minister (1755–1783)

Matthew Leydt (1755–1783) was the first graduate of Queen's College (now Rutgers University) in New Brunswick, New Jersey.

Matthew was the son of Syntje Slegt (1729–1763) (also spelled Tryntje Slecht or Sleight) and the Rev. Johannes Leydt (1718–1783), minister of the Dutch Reformed congregation at New Brunswick and at Six Mile Run in Franklin Township (both from 1748 until his death), and Trustee of Queen's CollegeMatriculating as a sophomore when instruction began in 1771, he graduated at the age of 19 with a Bachelor of Arts (A.B.) degree in 1774 —constituting the college's entire first graduating class. While at Queen's, Leydt studied under Frederick Frelinghuysen, the college's first tutor and was instructed in theology by the Rev. Jacob Rutsen Hardenbergh, who became the college's first president in 1786.

After graduation, Leydt was licensed to enter the ministry of the Dutch Reformed Church in 1778. He served at the Southampton Dutch Reformed Church in Neshaminy in Bucks County, Pennsylvania, until his death on November 24, 1783, in North Hampton, Pennsylvania, at the age of twenty-eight.
