= Geology Hall, New Brunswick, New Jersey =

Historic building at Queens Campus, State University of New Jersey

- Geology Hall
- U.S. Historic district – Contributing property
- New Jersey Register of Historic Places
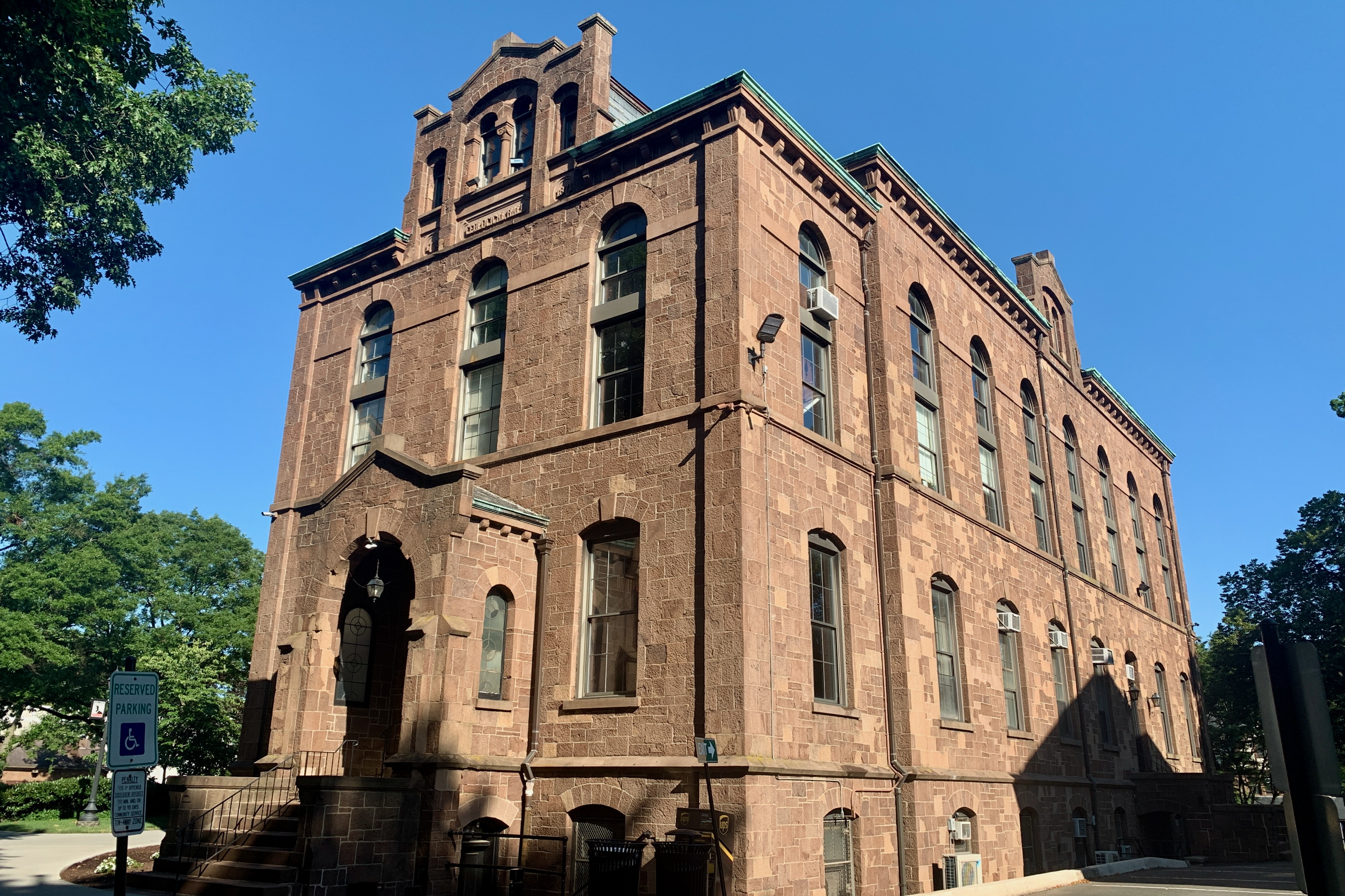
- Geology Hall in 2020

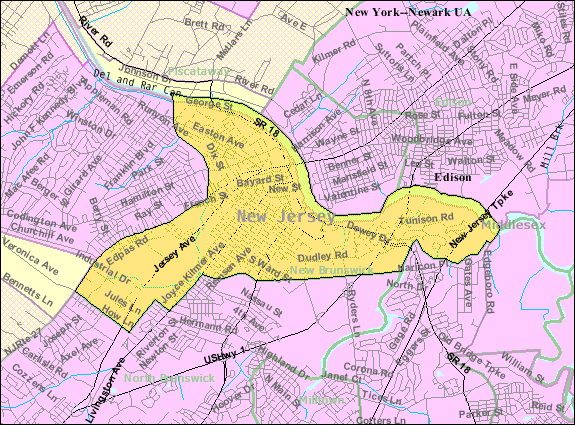
- Location within New Brunswick, NJ Location within Middlesex County, New Jersey Location within New Jersey Location within the United States
- Location: Rutgers University, New Brunswick, New Jersey
- Coordinates: 40°29′55″N 74°26′47.4″W
- Website: geologymuseum.rutgers.edu
- Part of: Queens Campus, Rutgers University (ID73001113)
- NJRHP No.: 1881

Significant dates
- Designated CP: July 2, 1973
- Designated NJRHP: January 29, 1973

Geology Hall (also Geological Hall) is a historic building on the Queens Campus of Rutgers University, in New Brunswick, New Jersey. It was built from April 1871 to June 1872 to house various science classes and the Rutgers Geology Museum. The museum was established in 1872 by George Hammell Cook, Rutgers' then professor of geology, with a collection of specimens whose assembly began in the 1830s under Cook's predecessor, Lewis Caleb Beck. As classes and offices moved out of the hall, the museum expanded until it occupied the entire hall by the mid-20th century. In 1973, the hall was added to the New Jersey and National Register of Historic Places (NRHP) with Old Queens, President's House, Van Nest Hall, Daniel S. Schanck Observatory, the Kirkpatrick Chapel, and Winants Hall as part of the Old Queens Campus historic district.

The hall was designed and built by Henry Janeway Hardenbergh in stone in a style its NRHP nomination form describes as "straightforward and [employing] both Gothic elements and classical forms."

== Site and architecture ==
Geology Hall stands on the Queens Campus of Rutgers University between Van Nest Hall and Old Queens, at 85 Somerset Street, New Brunswick, New Jersey. The building was designed by Henry Janeway Hardenbergh in a style its National Register of Historic Places (NRHP) nomination form describes as "straightforward and [employing] both Gothic elements and classical forms." Hardenbergh had intended for it to be built of brick, but late in the planning phase it was decided to build Geology Hall of stone.

As completed in 1872, Geology Hall contained laboratories on the first floor, the geological museum on the upper floors, an armory in the basement for the college's military school. In 1875, students from Princeton University stole 25 muskets from this armory in retaliation to the theft of a cannon from Princeton by Rutgers students. The basement was renovated into additional educational space in 1912.

== History ==
The origins of the Rutgers University Geology Museum are found in the 1830s, during the tenure of naturalist Lewis Caleb Beck. In his career as a chemist, physician, mineralogist, botanist, and educator, Beck acquired a collection of scientific samples that was displayed in Van Nest Hall. When Beck died in 1853, the Rutgers board of trustees purchased the collection and replaced Beck as professor of natural sciences with geologist George Hammell Cook. In the early 1860s, Cook convinced the board of trustees to establish its Scientific School and apply to become New Jersey's land-grant university under the Morrill Act of 1862.

These grants were secured in 1864, but the expansion of Rutgers' scientific curricula and low student enrollment caused the university financial strain. In 1870, Rutgers' president, William Henry Campbell, and the board of trustees began a fundraising campaign to support the Scientific School, and celebrate Rutgers' centennial. (Note: Rutgers University was founded in 1766; 1870 was the centennial anniversary of the university's second charter.) A sum of $121,000 (equivalent to $3,080,724 in 2025) was raised, of which the university allocated $63,000 (equivalent to $1,858,618 in 2025) for the construction of a building between Old Queens and Van Nest Hall to house much of the Scientific School's faculties.

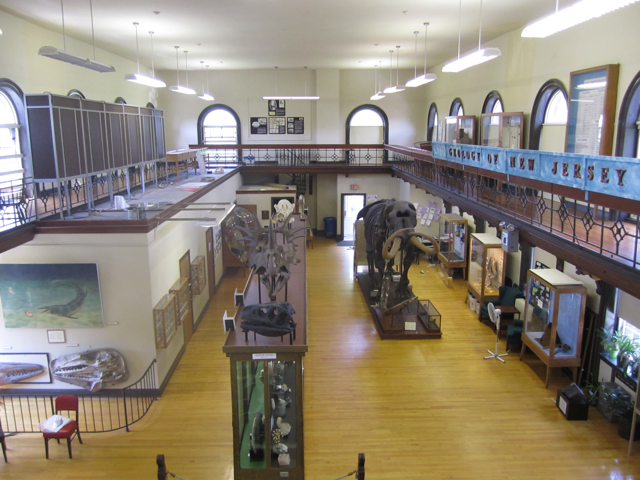
Interior of the hall, looking over the museum

The architect selected to design and construct that building was Henry Janeway Hardenbergh, a direct descendant of Jacob Rutsen Hardenbergh, Rutgers' first president. Construction of Geology Hall began with its groundbreaking in late April 1871; its cornerstone was laid by Theodore Fitz Randolph, then Governor of New Jersey, in a ceremony held on June 20, 1871. Included in the cornerstone was a time capsule containing issues of local newspapers and a history of Rutgers University. The building was finished in June 1872, and was dedicated on June 18, 1872.

The upper floors of Geology Hall were occupied by the Geology Museum, founded in 1872. The museum received its first curator in 1892 with the appointment of Albert Huntington Chester. Finding the museum in disarray, Chester hired naturalist William S. Valiant in 1893 to organize the collection. Valiant gradually took over Chester's duties as curator until 1903 when, following Chester's death, Valiant was made curator. Writing to Science in 1896, Valiant described a collection of almost 20,000 items, including a mastodon skeleton; by 1903, the collection numbered 30,000 items. In 1926, Rutgers' Physics Department left the Geology Hall, allowing the museum to expand into the rest of building. The museum's inventory was further enlarged in 1940 with the acquisition of the mineralogical collection of George Rowe, who had been director of the New Jersey Zinc Company mine at Franklin, New Jersey from 1906 to 1934.

On January 29, 1973, Geology Hall and the other the 19th century Queens Campus buildings were added to the New Jersey Register of Historic Places. This was followed by inclusion on the NRHP on July 2, 1973. Beginning in 1976, the museum changed its focus from research to outreach and education, and in 1977, the Geology Department moved into new offices on Rutgers' Busch Campus, leaving the Geology Museum the sole occupant of Geology Hall.

In 2013, rumors suggested that the university administration was planning to place the museum's exhibits in permanent storage and close the museum. A letter-writing campaign from alumni and the general public persuaded the university to retain and invest in the museum.

== Notes ==
=== Sources ===
- Barr, Michael C. (July 2, 1973). "Queen's Campus, Rutgers University (National Register of Historic Places Inventory – Nomination)" (pdf). National Park Service.
- Demarest, William Henry Steele (1924). A History of Rutgers College, 1766–1924. Rutgers University. OCLC 785305.
- McCormick, Richard P. (1966). Rutgers: A Bicentennial History. Rutgers University Press. OCLC 10208404.
- Neitzke-Adamo, Lauren; Blandford, A.J.; Criscione, Julia; Olsson, Richard K.; Gorder, Erika (November 27, 2018). "The Rutgers Geology Museum: America's first geology museum and the past 200 years of geoscience education" (PDF). In Rosenberg, Gary D.; Clary, Renee M. (eds.). Museums at the Forefront of the History and Philosophy of Geology: History Made, History in the Making. Vol. 535. Geological Society of America. pp. 217–36. doi:10.1130/2018.2535(14). ISBN 9780813795355.
- Rutgers University (2015). Rutgers: A 250th Anniversary Portrait. Third Millennium Publishing. ISBN 9781908990068.
- Valiant, William S. (October 16, 1896). "Rutgers College Museum". Science. 4 (94): 573–74. doi:10.1126/science.4.94.573.b. ISSN 0036-8075. JSTOR 1623127. PMID 17744833. S2CID 239506945.
