= Philoclean Society =

Student literary society at Rutgers University

- Founded: December 8, 1825; 199 years ago Rutgers University
- Type: Literary
- Affiliation: Independent
- Status: Active
- Scope: Local
- Chapters: 1
- Headquarters: New Brunswick, New Jersey; United States

The Philoclean Society at Rutgers University in New Brunswick, New Jersey was one of the oldest collegiate literary societies in the United States, and among the oldest student organizations at Rutgers University. Founded in 1825, the society was one of two such organizations—the other being the Peithessophian Society—on campus devoted to the same purpose.

The name Philoclean derives from the Ancient Greek for "lover of glory" from Φιλειν meaning "to love," and κλεος, meaning "glory."

== History ==
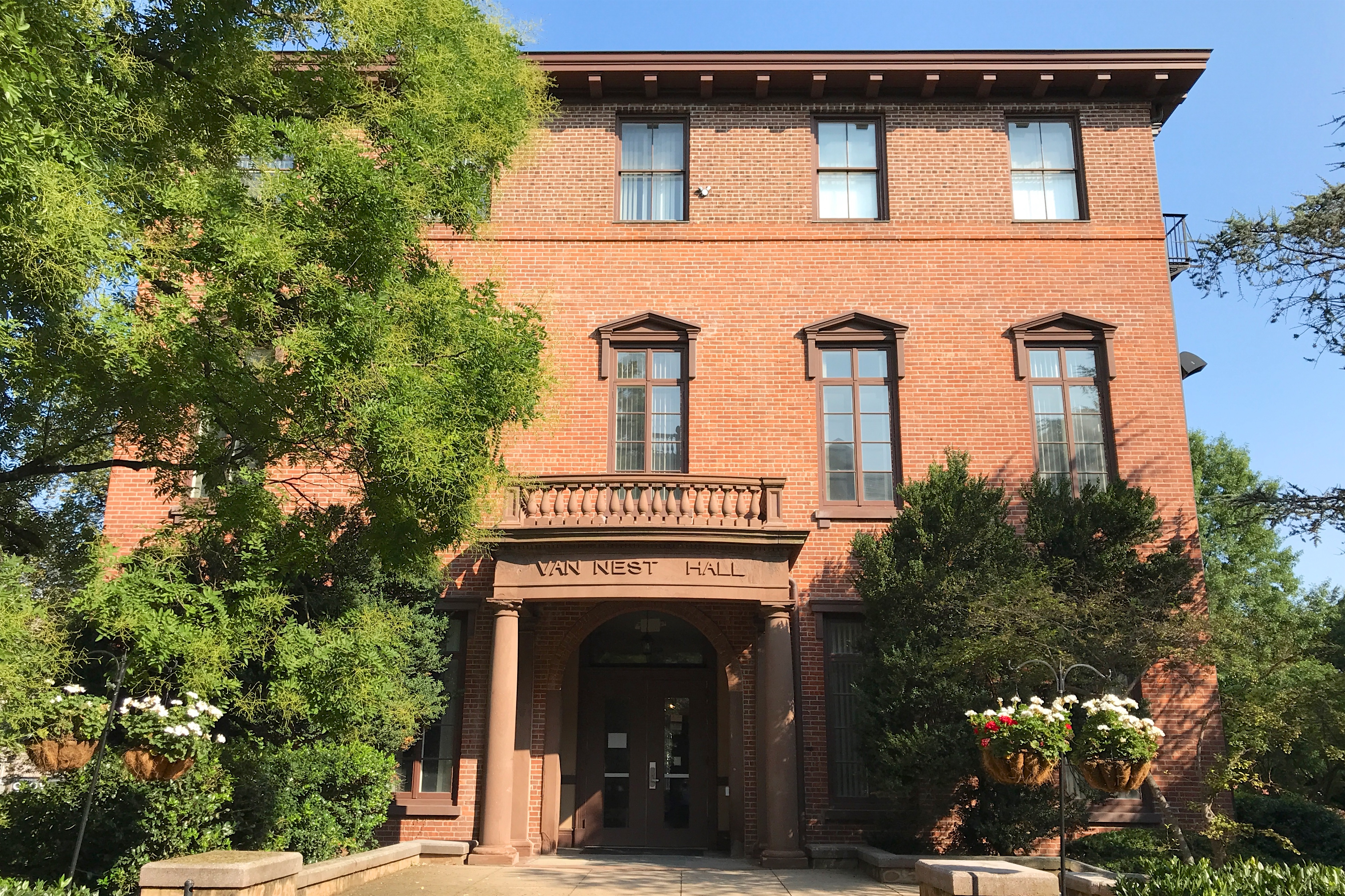
In the nineteenth century, Van Nest Hall housed the meeting rooms and libraries of the college's two rival literary and debating societies, Philoclean and Peithessophian.

The Philoclean Society is one of many literary societies that flourished at the nation's early colonial colleges. Before fraternities, publications, and other extracurricular activities became common, these groups—which generally bore Greek or Latin names—were the sole source of undergraduate social life. Indeed, it was not unusual for two or more groups to coexist at one institution, often in competition. Surviving examples include the Philodemic Society at Georgetown University, Union-Philanthropic Society at Hampden-Sydney College, the Philolexian Society at Columbia University, the Philomathean Society of the University of Pennsylvania, the Dialectic and Philanthropic Societies of the University of North Carolina at Chapel Hill, the Washington Literary Society and Debating Union and Jefferson Literary and Debating Society at The University of Virginia and the American Whig-Cliosophic Society at Princeton University.

The Philoclean Society of Rutgers College was founded December 8, 1825, under the auspices of William Craig Brownlee, a professor of Greek and Roman languages. The rival Peithessophian Society had been started just weeks earlier, enlisting the entire senior class as charter members. Thus, Philoclean's charter membership was of necessity drawn from the junior and sophomore classes which instituted a significant rivalry between the two societies, known as ‘’Philo’’ and ‘’Peitho’’ to students and alumni. The society, in its initial form, endured until the 1890s, when along with the Peithessophian Society, closed in 1898.

Several literary societies sought to fill the gap left by the decline of both societies, but a full revival did not begin until 1907 when the Literary Society of Rutgers College was formed, and later took the name "Philoclean." This society was markedly different from the original, chiefly focusing on the discussion of literature, and less attention to debate and oration. However, the society founded the Interscholastic Debating League for secondary schools across three states in 1914, and organized a rival society, the Philalethean Literary Society at the New Jersey College for Women (now Douglass College) in 1920. The society, however, declined and ceased to exist in 1932.

The societies engaged in rivalry by acquiring honorary members, who were believed in publicizing their acceptance, to raise the prestige of the society, serving to benefit the society through fundraising, as well as the donation of books and other materials. Honorary members leading historical, political, and literary figures of the nineteenth century, including most notably James Buchanan, Mark Twain, Fitz-Greene Halleck, Thomas Alva Edison, and Frederick T. Frelinghuysen. However, In 1879, when American humorist and author Mark Twain was invited, and accepted honorary membership in the Philoclean Society, he did not render the customary monetary donation.

In the same capacity that he was only partly accepted as a member of the Rutgers Glee Club, the singer, athlete, Rutgers valediction 1919 and political radical, Paul Robeson was elected to the Philoclean Society in 1917 without being allowed to fully share in its festivities due to the racist climate in the United States at the time.

== See also ==
- Rutgers University
- Rutgers University student organizations
