= Queens Campus, Rutgers University =

College campus in Middlesex County, New Jersey, US

- U.S. National Register of Historic Places
- U.S. Historic district
- New Jersey Register of Historic Places
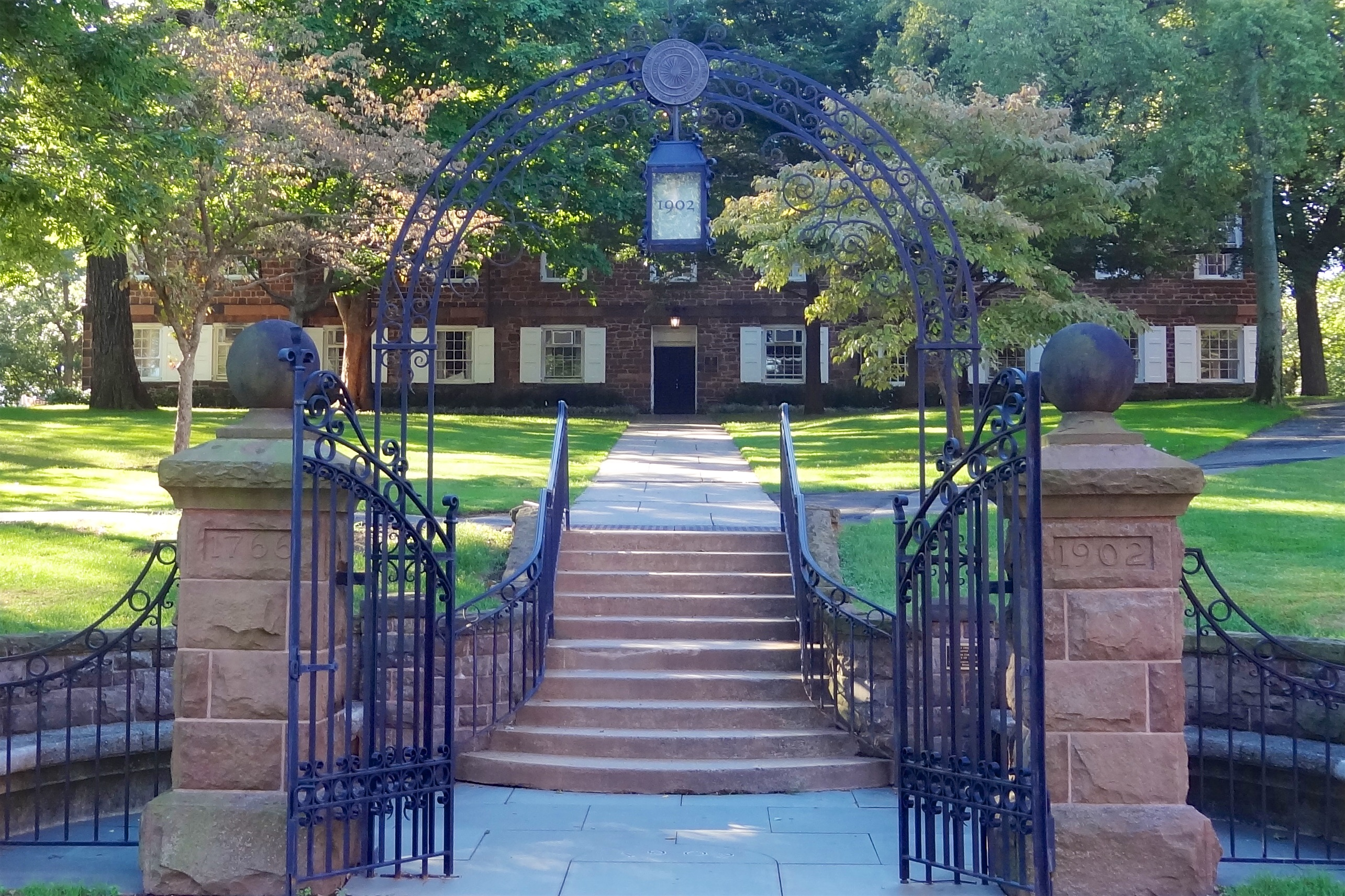
- Class of 1902 Memorial Gateway to the Queens Campus, Rutgers University

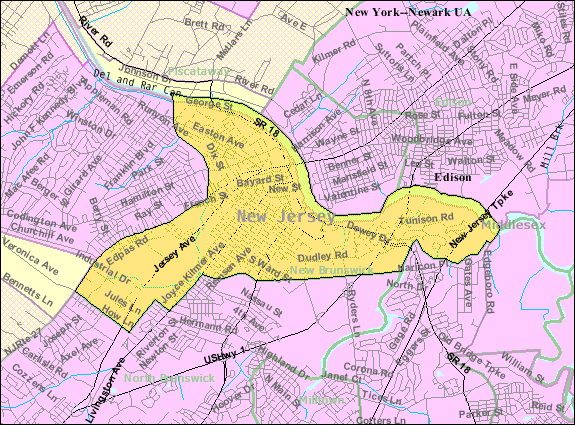
- Location within New Brunswick, NJ Location within Middlesex County, New Jersey Location within New Jersey Location within the United States
- Location: Bounded by College Avenue and George, Hamilton, and Somerset Streets; New Brunswick, New Jersey
- Coordinates: 40°29′54″N 74°26′46″W
- Area: 6 acres (2.4 ha)
- Built: 1825
- Architect: John McComb, Jr. Henry J. Hardenbergh
- Architectural style: Renaissance, Federal
- NRHP reference No.: 73001113
- NJRHP No.: 1881

Significant dates
- Added to NRHP: July 2, 1973
- Designated NJRHP: January 29, 1973

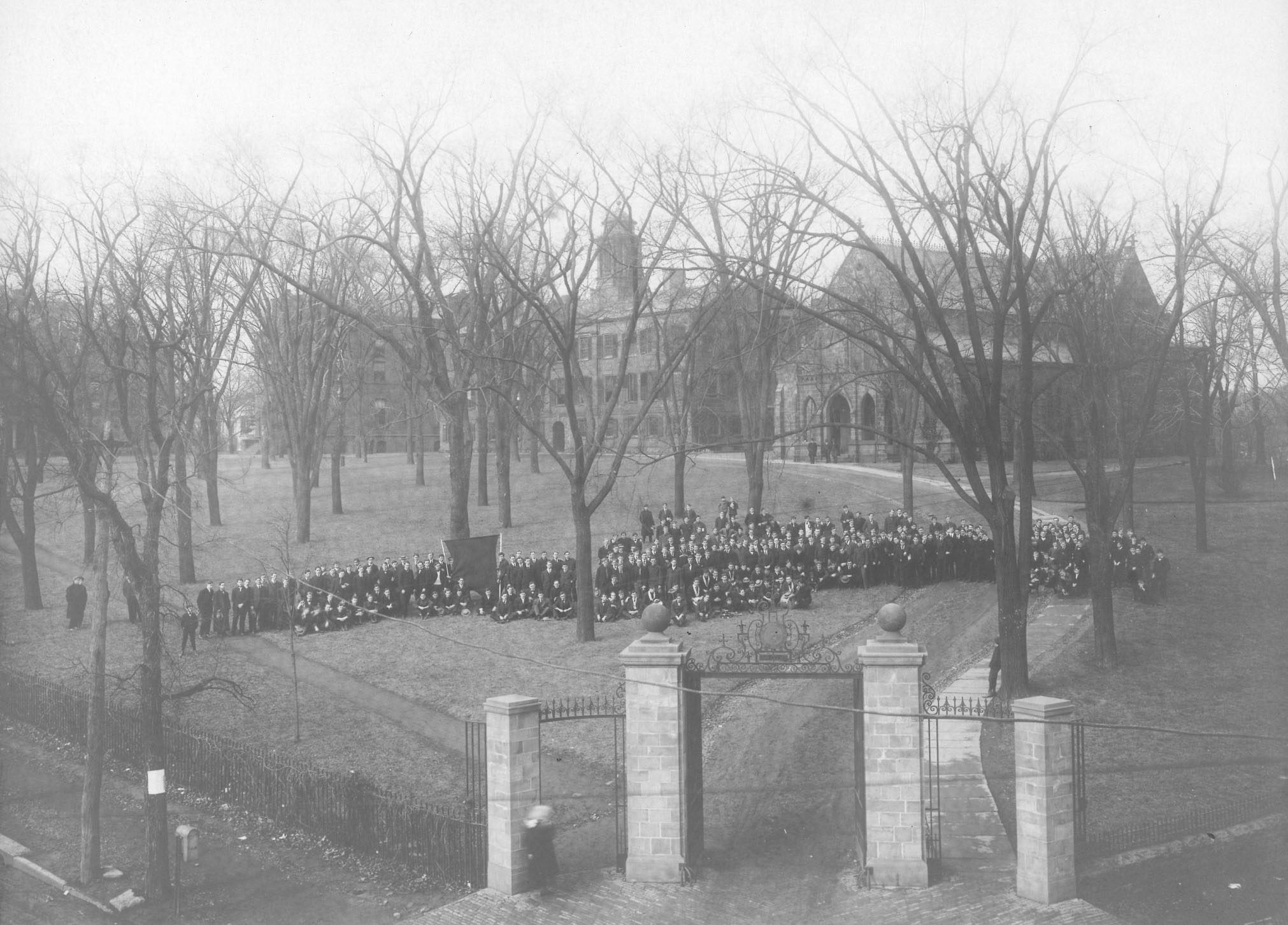
The student body assembled on Rutgers College's Queens Campus on February 14, 1906

The Queens Campus or Old Queens Campus (Note: Both forms of the name are used with similar frequency and context. Rutgers, The State University of New Jersey – Department of University Communications and Marketing. Rutgers Editorial Style Guide (Revised October 15, 2013), at 6, states: "Queen's College refers to the original name of Rutgers and is acceptable. Note that there is an apostrophe in Queen's College. Old Queens Campus is acceptable if in a historic reference; otherwise, do not use. Note that there is no apostrophe in Old Queens Campus. Old Queens Building is acceptable. When referring to the building on second reference, Old Queens is acceptable. Note that there is no apostrophe in Old Queens Building or Old Queens." Retrieved November 13, 2013.) is a historic section of the College Avenue Campus of Rutgers, The State University of New Jersey in New Brunswick, New Jersey, in the United States.

The Queens Campus spans one city block on a hilltop overlooking the Raritan River. In 1807, the heirs of John Parker of Perth Amboy led by James Parker, Jr., a prominent local merchant and political figure, donated a six-acre apple orchard to the trustees of Queen's College and its grammar school. The college—which was renamed Rutgers College in 1825—built its first building, Old Queens, from 1809 to 1823. Old Queens was used for instruction, student chapel services, and housed members of the college's faculty. In the institution's early years, the building housed the college, its grammar school (until 1830), and the New Brunswick Theological Seminary (until 1856).

By the end of the nineteenth century, the Queens Campus contained seven buildings designed by architects John McComb, Jr., Nicholas Wyckoff, Williard Smith, Henry Janeway Hardenbergh, and Van Campen Taylor. These buildings were erected to accommodate the small but expanding liberal arts college's classroom instruction, student activities, faculty offices, chapel, library, and housing into the middle of the twentieth century. Six buildings remain and are used to accommodate the university's core administrative offices, a geological museum, the college chapel, and a former astronomical observatory that is no longer used. The Queens Campus was included on the New Jersey Register of Historic Places and National Register of Historic Places in 1973. The oldest building, Old Queens, was designated as a national landmark in 1976.

== History ==
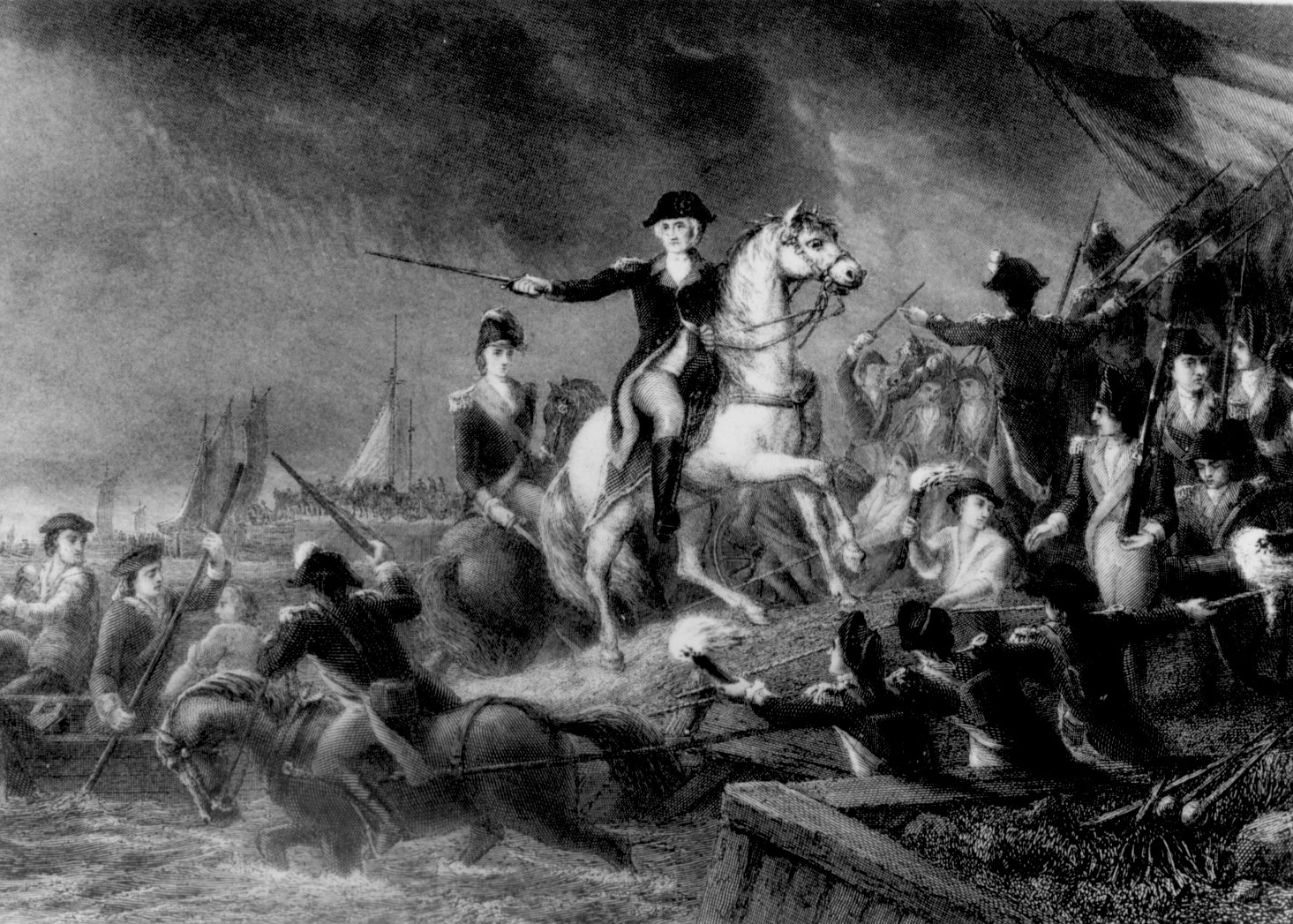
Washington and his forces retreated through New Jersey after surrendering New York City in November 1776, passing through New Brunswick with the British following close behind

The Queens Campus contains the historic core of the Rutgers University community and houses the offices of the university's president and key administrative posts. The campus is located on one city block adjacent to New Brunswick's commercial district. This block is bounded by Somerset Street, George Street, Hamilton Street, and College Avenue. The six building that occupy the campus are the university's oldest structures and represent a range of nineteenth-century architectural styles. Due to its architectural and historical significance, Queens Campus was included on the New Jersey Register of Historic Places on January 29, 1973, and on the National Register of Historic Places on July 2, 1973. Often evoked as a symbol of the university's heritage, Old Queens was listed as a National Historic Landmark on May 11, 1976.

The hilltop on which Queens Campus was later erected was where Alexander Hamilton, then an artillery captain commanding sixty men of the New York Provincial Company of Artillery, placed his cannons to cover the retreat of George Washington's forces in late November 1776. After disastrous defeats at Long Island, Harlem Heights, and Fort Washington, Washington surrendered New York City to the British. British forces commanded by Lieutenant General Lord Cornwallis under orders from Lieutenant General William Howe, 5th Viscount Howe pursued Washington as far as New Brunswick, where he and his troops forded the Raritan River and passed through New Brunswick on their way south into Pennsylvania. Positioned on the hilltop above the Raritan, Hamilton's artillery slowed the British advance and afforded Washington sufficient time to escape. One American combatant, Captain Enoch Anderson, remarked that, "A severe cannonading took place on both sides, and several were killed and wounded on our side." The British forces occupied New Brunswick for the next seven months, and a battalion of Hessian troops were encamped on the site. A historic marker erected as a gift of the Class of 1899 is located next to the chapel marking the location of Hamilton's battery.

A few years after receiving its charter in 1766, Queen's College began holding classes in a local tavern and students boarded at houses in the city. The Rev. Ira Condict became the school's third president in 1795, but financial constraints forced the college to close for several years. Condict focused on operating the college's grammar school until sufficient funds were raised to support the college's reopening.

In 1807, Perth Amboy merchant John Parker bequeathed a six-acre apple orchard on a hill in New Brunswick to the trustees of Queen's College. Condict had been raising funds to reopen the school with the assistance of Andrew Kirkpatrick, Chief Justice of the New Jersey Supreme Court, a trustee who taught at the grammar school in 1782. With a successful fundraising effort, obtaining the support of the Reformed Church's Synod of New York, and with Parker's donation of the six-acre apple orchard tract, Queen's College was reopened. The trustees decided to build a large building to house the college's instruction, and provide housing for the faculty, to house the grammar school. The building would also house a theological seminary, run by the Rev. John Henry Livingston, that the Synod decided to move from New York to New Brunswick. Condict laid the cornerstone of Old Queens in 1809. The following year, he resigned as president despite requests that he accept the post in full capacity. Condict elected to return to teaching and toward ministering to his congregation at the city's First Reformed Church, and he was succeeded by Livingston.

The college, grammar school, and theological seminary shared Old Queens for several years, although Queen's College would close again for a few years later after continued financial troubles in the wake of the War of 1812. In 1825, after an effort by Livingston to raise funds and a generous donation by Colonel Henry Rutgers, the college reopened. The trustees renamed it Rutgers College in honor of Rutgers' gift. In 1830, the grammar school moved to a building across College Avenue, built by Nicholas Wyckoff, now known as Alexander Johnston Hall. After student bodies of both the college and theological seminary expanded in the 1850s, the New Brunswick Theological Seminary built their own building, Hertzog Hall, on a hill one half-mile away in 1856. The grammar school would remain associated with the University until 1957. With the university fully transitioning from a private institution into a state university, the university and the school, now called Rutgers Preparatory School severed their ties. The preparatory school relocated to a new campus in Somerset.

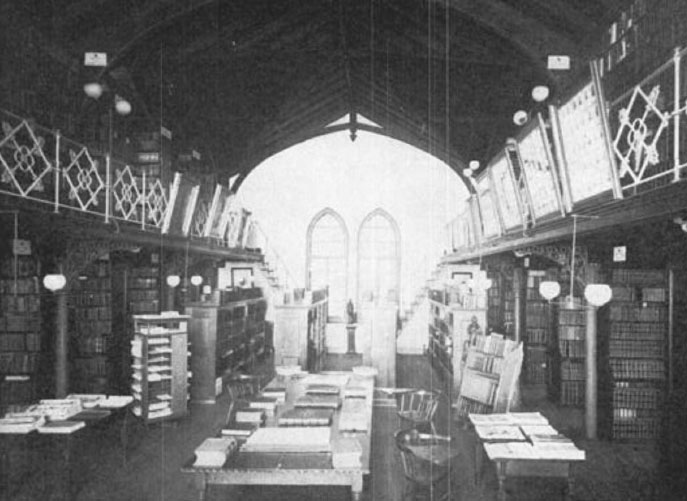
The college's first library (c. 1890s) on the second floor the rear section of Kirkpatrick Chapel. This area was converted into part of the chapel's chancel in a 1916 renovation.

In the 1860s, Rutgers began expanding with the addition of science, engineering, military, and agricultural education as New Jersey's sole land grant college, and with substantial financial support and donations. In the last four decades of the 19th century, Rutgers built its first astronomical observatory, a geological hall, a chapel and library, and its first dormitory on the Queens Campus tract, erecting a building to house the New Jersey Agricultural Experiment Station (1889) across Hamilton Street from the campus, and by expanding its college farm to the east of the city.

In the first two decades of the twentieth century, Rutgers expanded its student body, and built a larger campus in New Brunswick—starting with library (1903), gymanisum, and additional classroom buildings on the Voorhees Mall. The university would continue to expand in New Brunswick, Piscataway, and surrounding communities with the addition of land that is now the College Avenue, Busch, Livingston, Cook, Douglass campuses. It has grown from a small liberal arts college offering instruction to a student body of a few hundred students to a major state university bestowing over 14,000 degrees a year. As of 2013, 65,000 undergraduate and graduate students study at Rutgers, instructed by more than 9,000 full-time and part-time faculty and supported by more than 15,000 full-time and part-time staff members. In Rutgers' 247 years, over 450,000 alumni from all 50 U.S. states and more than 120 foreign countries have attended and received degrees from the university. Today, the buildings on the Queens Campus house the administrative offices for one of America's largest state university systems with campuses in three cities and programs statewide, the college chapel, an active geological museum, and a preserved nineteenth-century astronomical observatory.

== Buildings and grounds ==
=== Old Queens (1809–23) ===
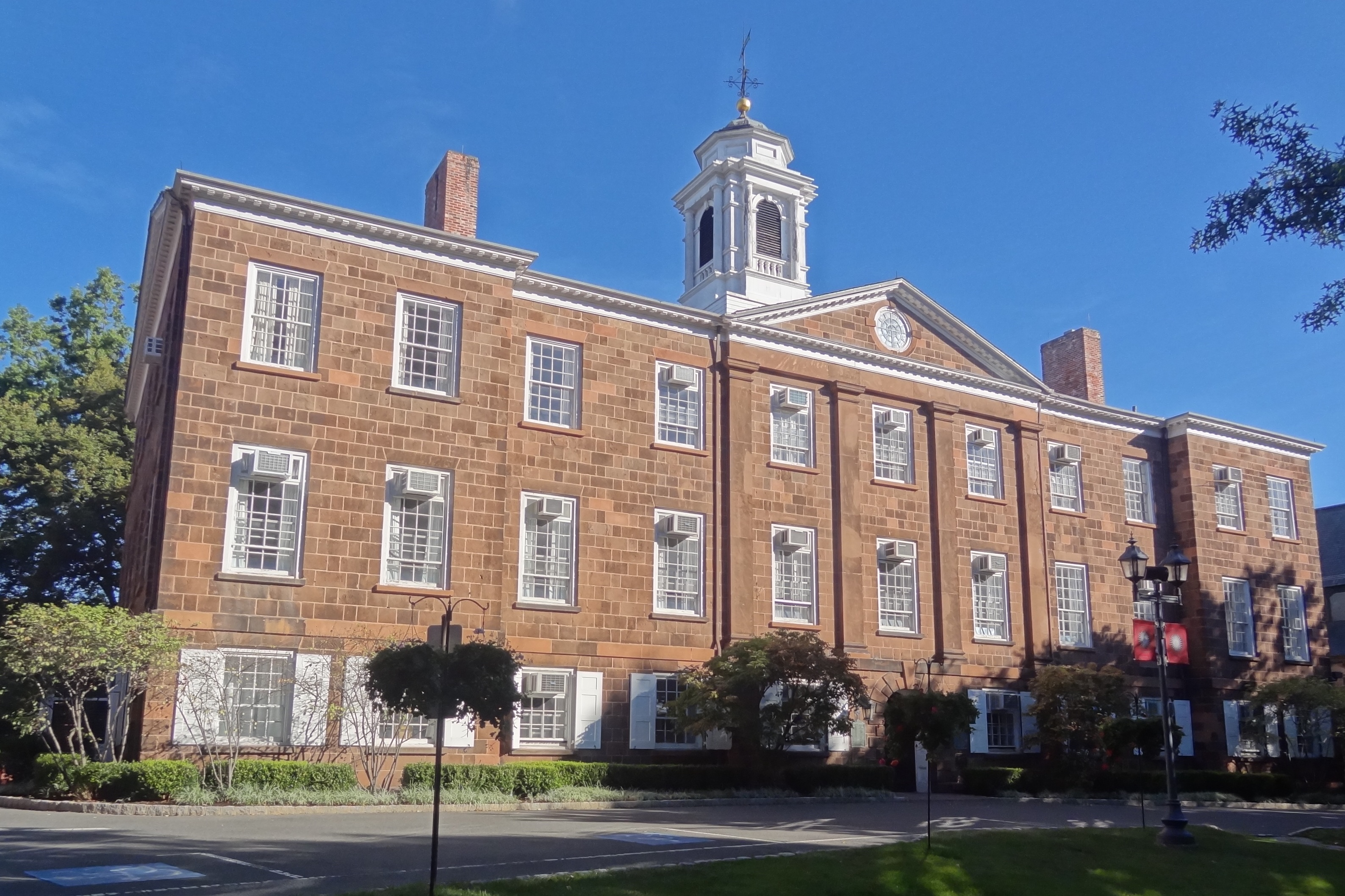
Old Queens, oldest building at Rutgers University

After a successful effort to raise funds to reopen Queen's College, the trustees hired New York architect John McComb, Jr. (1763–1853) to design and oversee the construction of a building to house the college. McComb was known for several landmarks in New York City and the surrounding region, including several lighthouses, Gracie Mansion (1799), Hamilton Grange (1802), New York City Hall (1803), and St. John's Chapel (1803, demolished 1918). McComb designed a three-story Federal-style edifice built from New Jersey brownstone.

The cornerstone for Old Queens was laid on April 27, 1809 by Queen's College's president, the Rev. Ira Condict, who did so "with his left hand, in consequence of suffering a temporary lameness in his right." Classes began within the completed portions of the building as early as 1811 for Queen's College (now Rutgers University), Queen's College Grammar School (now Rutgers Preparatory School), and the New Brunswick Theological Seminary. The college was forced to close temporarily, not reopening until 1825. Henry Rutgers donated funds to reopen the school in the form of a $5,000 bond, and gave a bell that was placed in the cupola of Old Queens. The bell is rung on important events, including convocations, commencements, and key athletic victories. Today, Old Queens houses the offices of the university president and upper administrative staff.

=== President's House (1841–42) ===
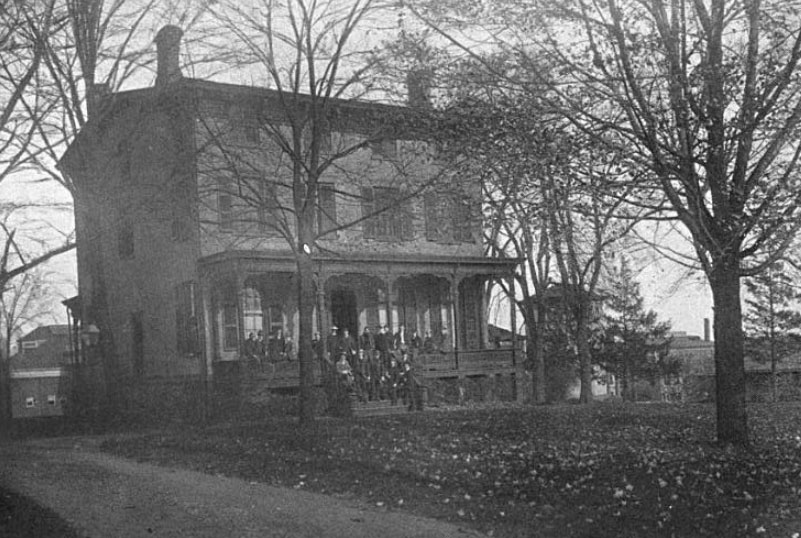
The President's House, circa 1901, was used for fine arts classes

The board of trustees appropriated $8,000 to build a residence for the college's president that was completed in 1842. The college's sixth president, Abraham Bruyn Hasbrouck, was the first to take up residence in the house. His predecessor, Philip Milledoler lived in Old Queens and John Henry Livingston owned a home on an avenue that was renamed Livingston Avenue in his honor.

With the appointment of John Charles Van Dyke as art history professor in 1891, the "President's House" was used for classes and studio space for the college's Department of Fine Arts. During this period, it housed the college's art collections, including the Thomas L. Janeway Memorial Collection. Janeway, an 1863 alumnus of the college, provided a collection of casts, marble, lithographs, and photographs with a focus on classical archaeology that illustrated "the topography, art, life, and literature of Ancient Greece and Rome." In 1917, the Rutgers Club of New Brunswick renovated the building for the "social uses of the alumni and faculty." The building was razed after sustaining considerable damage during the Great Atlantic hurricane which made landfall in the New York City area in September 1944. The demolition took place from February to March 1954. Presently, The location of the former President's House is "Lot 1", a parking lot on the Queens Campus.

=== Van Nest Hall (1845) ===
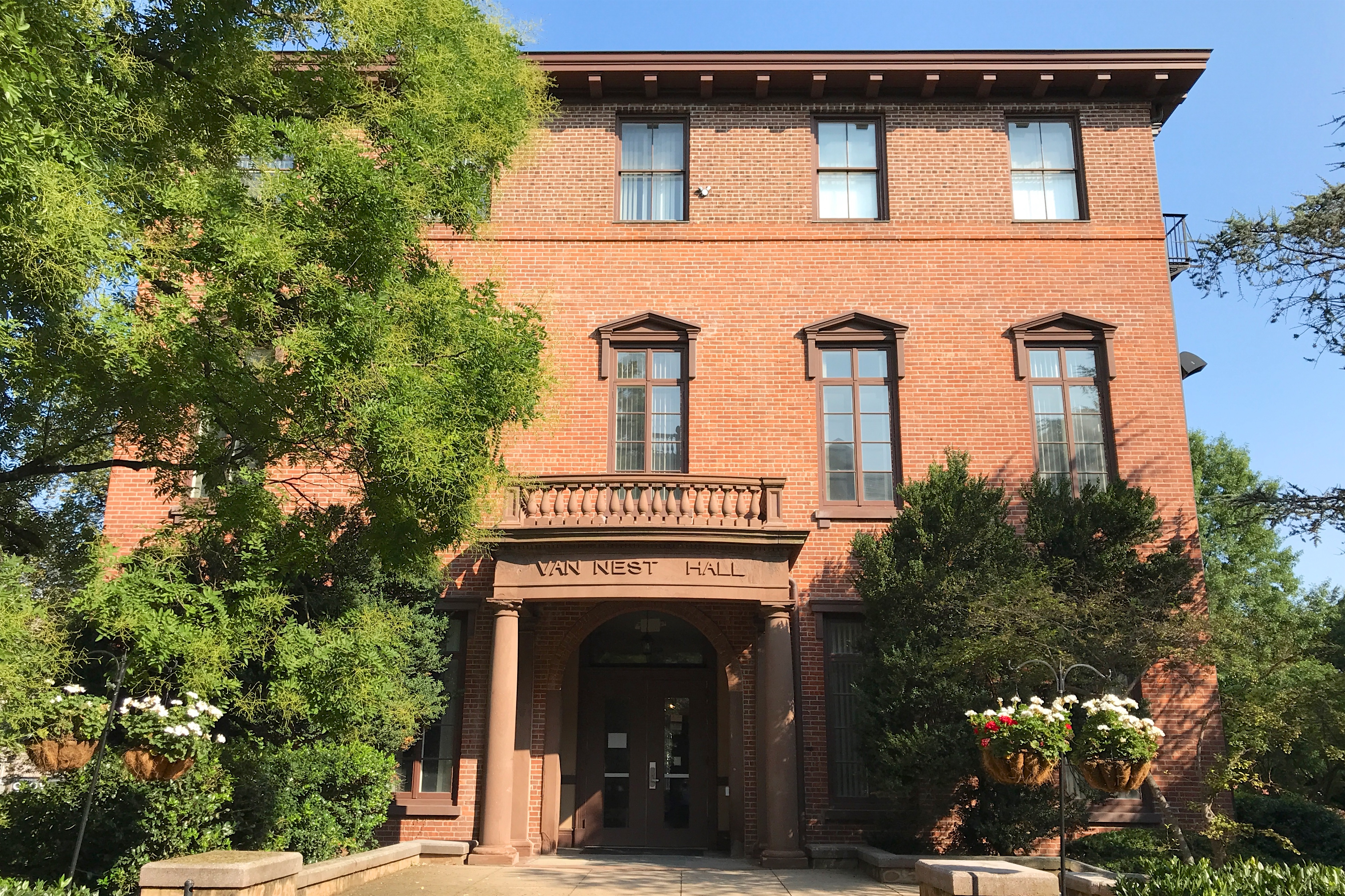
In the nineteenth century, Van Nest Hall housed the meeting rooms and libraries of the college's two rival literary and debating societies

In 1845, Rutgers College hired local builder and architect Nicholas Wyckoff to build a two-story brick building in the southwest corner of the college's small campus. The trustees named the new building after Abraham Van Nest (1777–1864), a New York City merchant and president of the Greenwich Savings Bank, who served as a trustee for over forty years, "in recognition of his services and gifts." The building featured two large rooms on its first floor which were used by the school's two literary societies, Peithessophian and Philoclean which were significant in campus life in the nineteenth century. The second floor contained the chemical laboratory of Professor Lewis Caleb Beck (1798–1853) who taught at Rutgers for 23 years.

In 1893, supported by donation from Van Nest's daughter, Ann Van Nest Bussing, the trustees expanded the building by adding a third floor and adding "an appropriate stone porch." The first floor at this time had been renovated to house the college's history faculty and a chapter of the Young Men's Christian Association (YMCA). In 1893, the new third floor boasted a "large and well-lighted room for the uses of classes in draughting" and the second floor for work in graphics, while housing collections of the Engineering school. In 1917, Van Nest's second and third floors were occupied by the English and education department.

=== Daniel S. Schanck Observatory (1865) ===
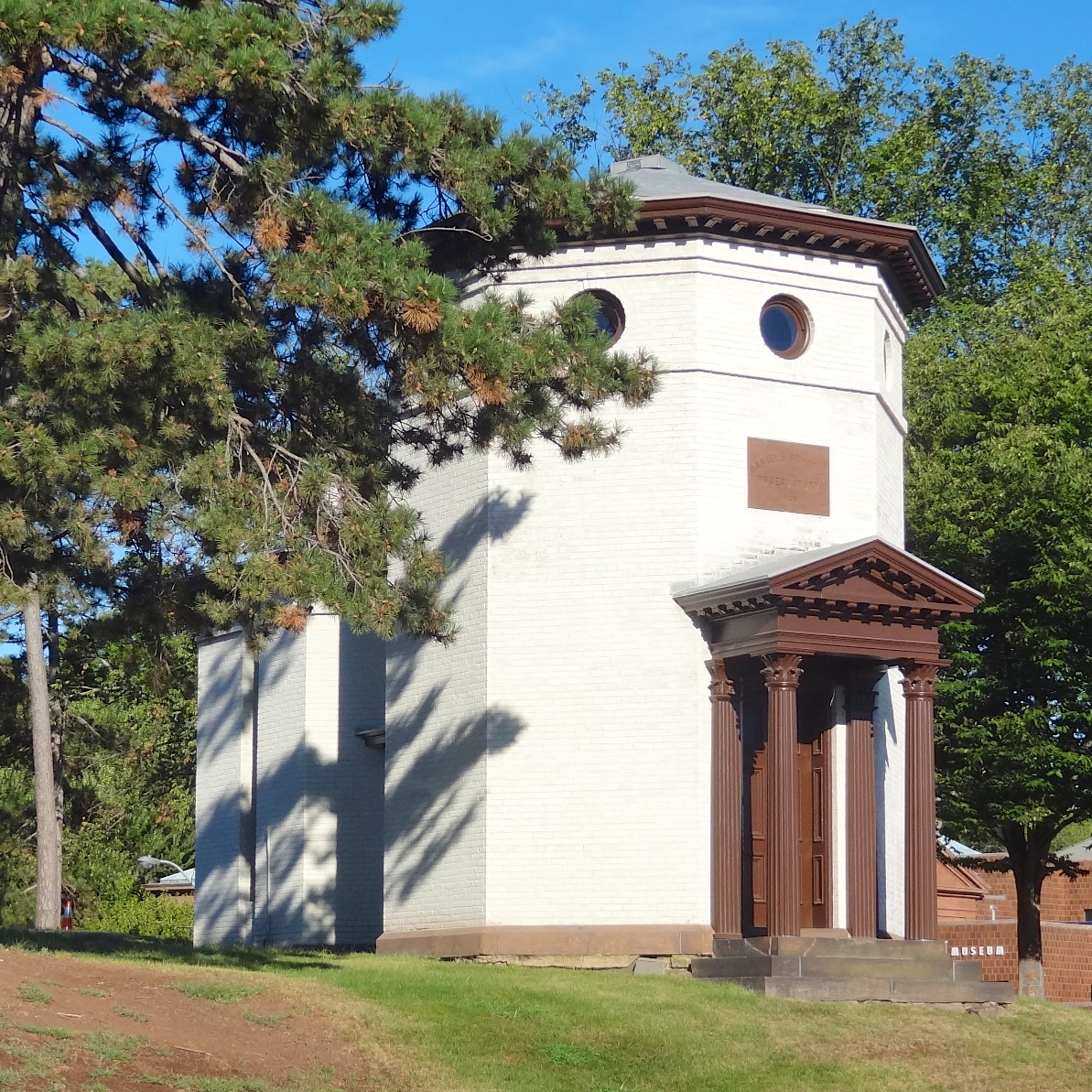
Daniel S. Schanck Observatory as seen from George Street

The Daniel S. Schanck Observatory was designed by architect Willard Smith as a copy of the Tower of the Winds in Athens. The two-story Greek Revival octagonal brick astronomical observatory was built in 1865 soon after Rutgers College was selected as New Jersey's sole land grant college. Rutgers named the building after New York City businessman, Daniel S. Schanck, who donated a large portion of the funds to construct and equip the observatory. The cost of cost of construction and equipment amounted to US$6,166 (2013: US$86,845.07), (Note: This inflation adjustment calculation projects that $1 in 1865 would have $14.08 in purchasing power in 2013 (conversion factor: 0.071), using data compiled by Oregon State University Political Science professor Robert Sahr in "Inflation Conversion Factors for years 1774 to estimated 2023, in dollars of recent years" reflecting final 2012 CPI (2.29594 in dollars of 1982–84). Last update May 15, 2013. Retrieved September 2, 2013.) of which US$2,400 (2013: US$33,802.82) was donated by Schanck (1812–1872). Rutgers equipped the observatory with "a 6.5-inch equatorial refracting telescope, a meridian circle with four-inch object glass for transit observations, a sidereal clock, a mean solar clock...chronograph, repeating circle, and other instruments."

The Schanck Observatory served as the university's first astronomical facility and was used to provide instruction to its students through the nineteenth and early twentieth century. It is no longer in use.

=== Geology Hall (1872) ===
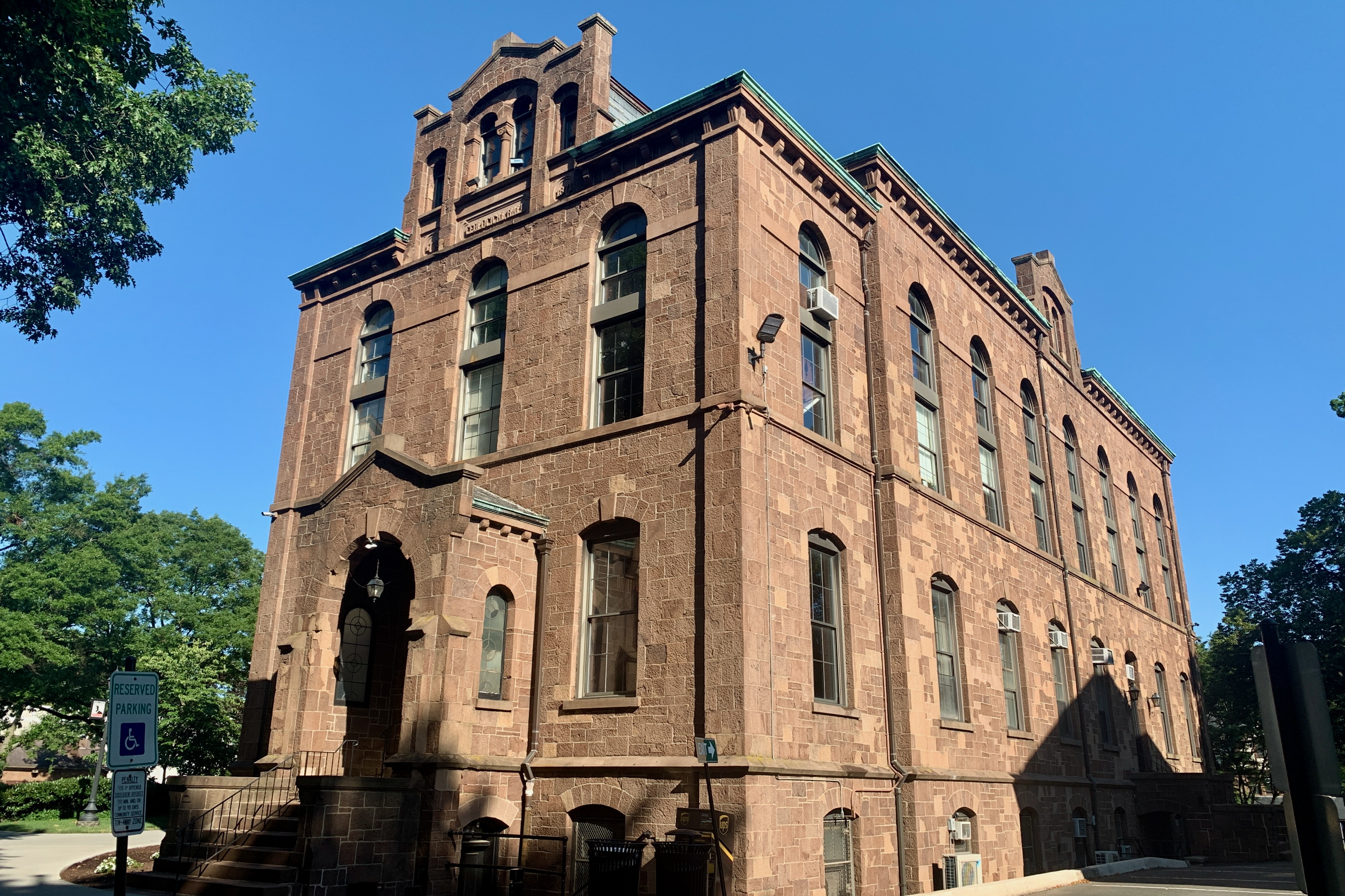
Designed in the Gothic Revival style by architect Henry Janeway Hardenburgh, Geology Hall was built in 1872

Geology Hall, formerly Geological Hall, was built in 1872 with funds raised by the college's president, William Henry Campbell for the purpose of facilitating the expansion of science and agriculture education. Rutgers expanded these programs after being named New Jersey's only land grant college. The design was the second of three projects for Rutgers College prepared by architect Henry Janeway Hardenbergh. Hardenbergh's design called initially for a Gothic Revival style brick building, although it was revised to use brownstone, a cheaper alternative.

The building's first floor provided rooms for laboratory and lecture instruction for the college's physics, military science, and geology departments, as well as house the college's armory. The second floor was designed to accommodate a geological museum.

At present, the building houses administrative offices and the university's geological museum. The museum, which is among the oldest collegiate geology collections in the United States, was founded by state geologist and Rutgers professor George Hammell Cook in 1872. It features exhibits on geology, paleontology, and anthropology, with an emphasis on the natural history of New Jersey, that include fluorescent zinc minerals from Franklin and Ogdensburg, a dinosaur trackway discovered in Towaco, a mastodon from Salem County, and a Ptolemaic era Egyptian mummy.

=== Kirkpatrick Chapel (1873) ===
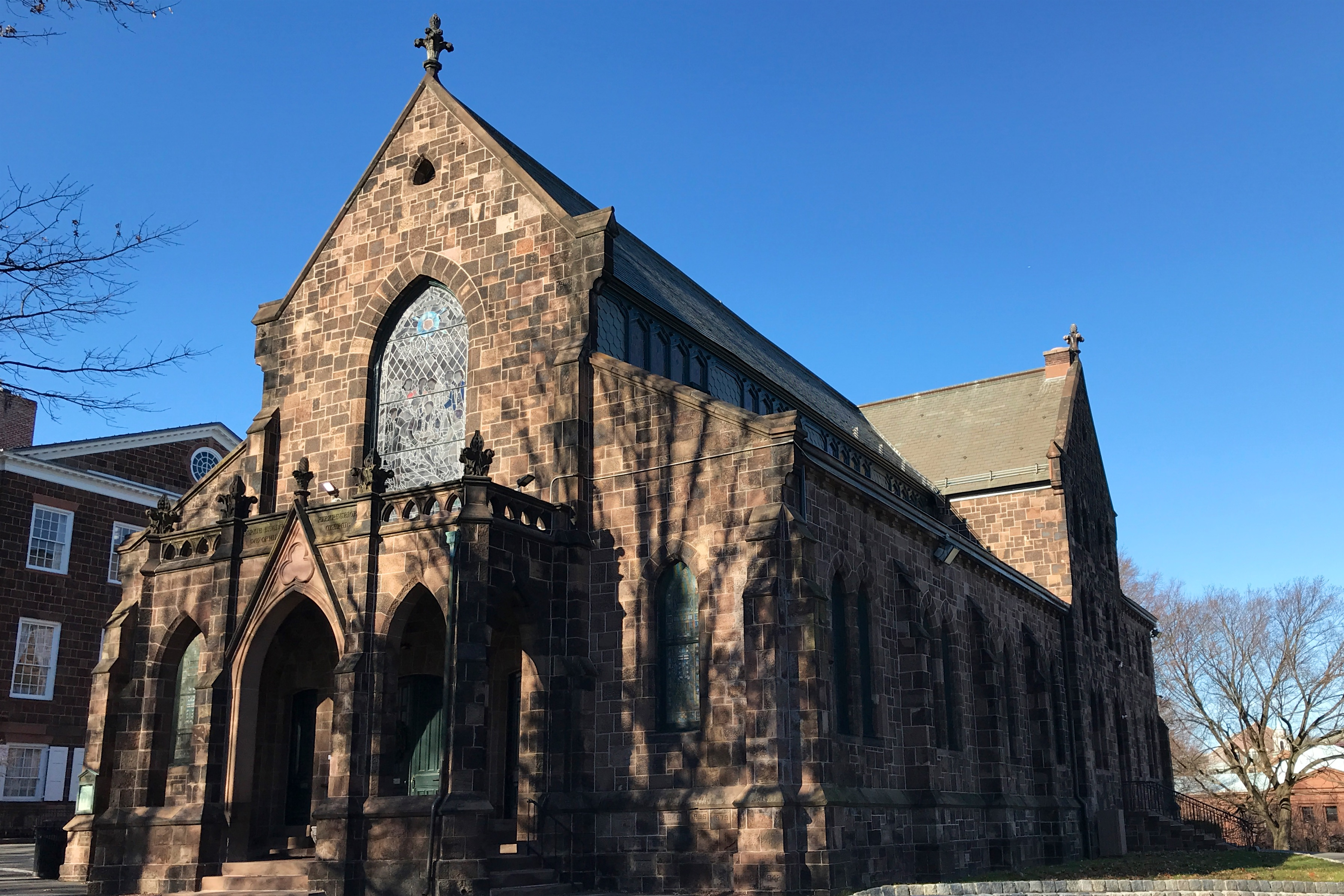
Kirkpatrick Chapel

When Sophia Astley Kirkpatrick died in 1871, she left named Rutgers College as the residuary legatee of her estate. The college's trustees decided to appropriate most of the bequest to fund the construction of a chapel. The chapel was designed by Henry Janeway Hardenbergh at the beginning his career, and in the third of three projects for the college. Hardenbergh employed the High Victorian Gothic Revival style—and in particular features common to fourteenth-century German and English Gothic churches—popular at the middle of the nineteenth century.

The exterior of Kirkpatrick Chapel was built from New Jersey brownstone, and has been described as "similar to an English country church." One author described the interior of the chapel as "exceedingly beautiful, having a roof of open timber, finished in black walnut and stained pine, resting for its center support on slender iron columns painted to correspond with the delicately tinted walls." According to the New Jersey Historic Trust, the chapel's stained glass windows feature "some of the first opalescent and multicolored sheet glass manufactured in America." Four of the chapels windows were created by the studios of Louis Comfort Tiffany.

For its first 30 years, the chapel was used as a college library and for 50 years for daily student body chapel services. As the college's student body increased in size, student body chapel services became less frequent until Rutgers transitioned to become New Jersey's state university beginning in 1945. The chapel is available to students, alumni, and faculty of all faiths and a variety of services are held throughout the academic term. It is also used for university events including convocation, concerts, alumni and faculty weddings, funerals, and often as the site of lectures by prominent intellectuals and world leaders. Since 1876, graduating classes would have a stone on the exterior of the chapel carved with their class year.

=== Winants Hall (1890) ===
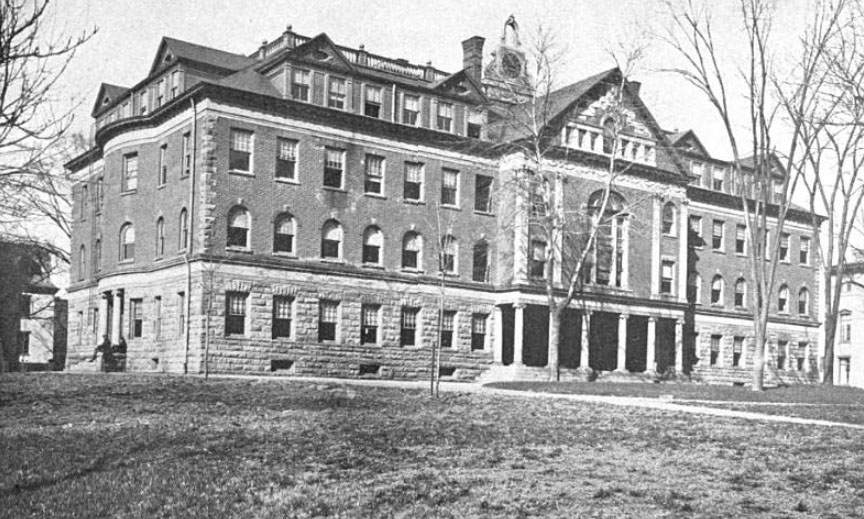
Winant's Hall, built 1890, was the college's first dormitory

During the eighteenth and nineteenth century, students rented rooms from local boarding houses as the college did not offer dormitories or other student housing. In 1890, Garret E. Winants, a college trustee and wealthy philanthropist from Bayonne presented to the trustees a sketch of a proposed dormitory and a donation of $75,000 to build it. The building was designed by architect Van Campen Taylor, an 1867 graduate of Rutgers College, and Winants Hall was erected in 1890. Winants would serve as Rutgers College's sole dormitory until 1915 when Ford Hall was built on the Voorhees Mall along College Avenue. After World War II, Winants was converted to offices for faculty and academic departments, and for administrative staff.

In 1990, a century after its construction, Winants Hall underwent a $9.4 million restoration. The building currently houses the university's alumni relations and legal counsel offices, and the university's fundraising arm, the Rutgers University Foundation.

=== Grounds ===
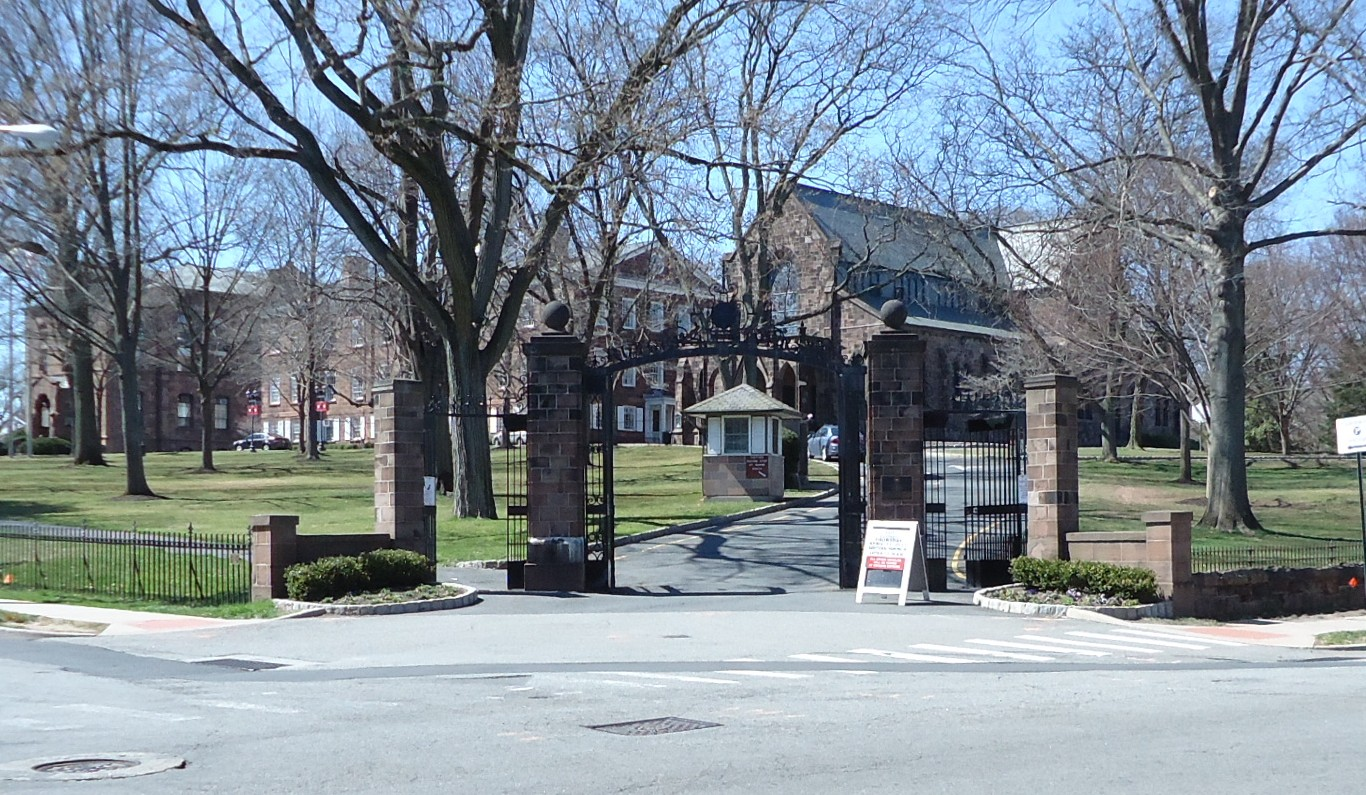
The Queens Campus seen from George Street through the Class of 1883 Memorial Gateway

The Queens Campus is a six-acre tract. During his ten-year tenure as Rutgers College's sixth president during the 1840s, Abraham Bruyn Hasbrouck (1791–1879) began planting and caring for "many of the noble trees that now adorn the campus."

There are four gates on providing entrance to the campus:

- The Class of 1883 Memorial Gateway (erected in 1904) is located at the northeast corner of George Street and Somerset Streets and is the main entrance for vehicle and foot traffic to the Queens Campus.
- The Henry Rutgers Baldwin Gateway (erected 1901) located on the south side of the campus on College Avenue roughly half of the distance between Somerset and Hamilton Streets. It was named for Henry Rutgers Baldwin, an alumnus from the Rutgers College class of 1849. It provides an exit for vehicular traffic.
- The Class of 1882 Gateway (erected 1907) at the southeast corner of Somerset Street and College Avenue.
- The Class of 1902 Memorial Gateway (erected in 1904) is located on the western side of the campus on Hamilton Street half the distance between George Street and College Avenue. It features a wrought iron and brownstone entrance portal and brownstone stairway and provides access to foot traffic between the Queens Campus and Voorhees Mall sections of the College Avenue Campus. It is through this last gate that graduating seniors have walked in procession during Commencement exercises held in May in years past.

The campus contains several memorials, including trees planted in honour of victims of the September 11, 2001 terrorist attacks, and other persons connected to the university. Located in front of Old Queens, the Class of 1877 Cannon commemorates both the Rutgers-Princeton Cannon War and several alumni who have served in the United States military. As a tradition during commencement, those graduating break clay pipes over the cannon as a symbol of breaking ties with their "pipe dreams" of youth and embarking into adulthood. In front of the cannon is a plaque given in 1949 by the Rutgers College class of 1924 in memory of three military servicemen who died in World War II.

== Gallery ==
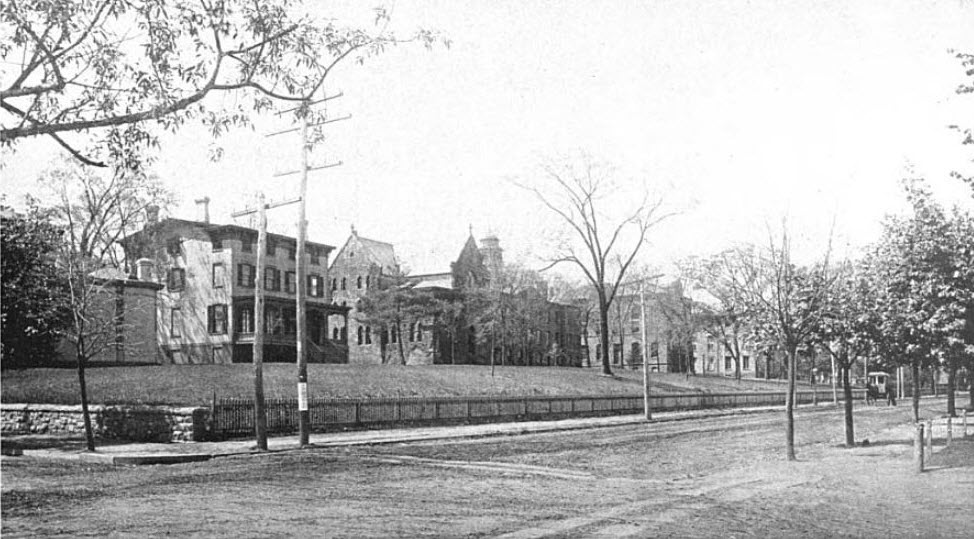
The rear of the Queen's Campus, circa 1901, seen from the corner of Hamilton Street and George Street
