= Old Queens =

- U.S. National Register of Historic Places
- U.S. National Historic Landmark
- U.S. Historic district – Contributing property
- New Jersey Register of Historic Places
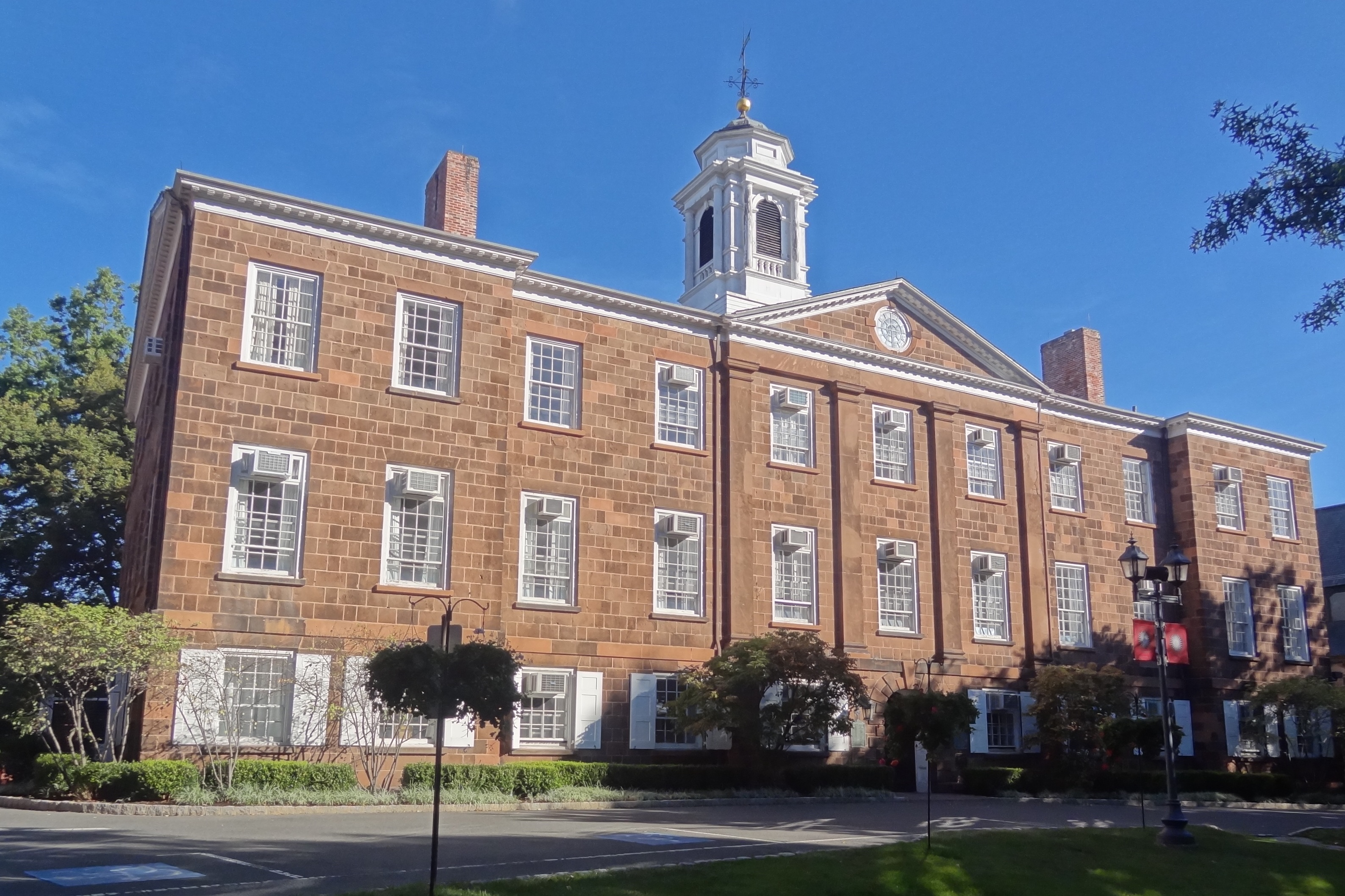
- Old Queens, oldest building at Rutgers University

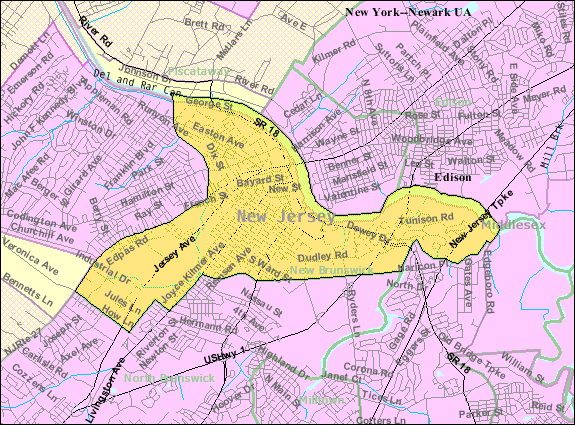
- Location within New Brunswick, NJ Location within Middlesex County, New Jersey Location within New Jersey Location within the United States
- Location: New Brunswick, New Jersey
- Coordinates: 40°29′55.5″N 74°26′46.5″W
- Built: 1809–1825
- Architect: John McComb Jr.
- Architectural style: Federal
- Part of: Queens Campus, Rutgers University (ID73001113)
- NRHP reference No.: 76001164
- NJRHP No.: 1878

Significant dates
- Added to NRHP: May 11, 1976
- Designated NHL: May 11, 1976
- Designated CP: July 2, 1973
- Designated NJRHP: May 11, 1976

Old Queens is the oldest building at Rutgers University and is the symbolic heart of the university's campus in New Brunswick in Middlesex County, New Jersey. Rutgers, the eighth-oldest college in the United States, was founded in 1766 during the American colonial period as Queen's College. Queen's College was named for Charlotte of Mecklenburg-Strelitz, the daughter of a German duke who became the queen consort of British king George III. Old Queens is located on a six-acre hilltop city block bounded by Somerset Street, Hamilton Street, College Avenue and George Street that was previously an apple orchard. Donated to the college in 1807 by James Parker, Jr., this city block become known as Queens Campus, and is now home to the university president's office as well as the meeting place of the Board of Trustees, so remains the historic core and seat of the university. By metonymy, the name "Old Queens" came to be used as a reference to Rutgers College, and is still often invoked as an allusive reference to the university, or to its central administration.

Designed by American architect John McComb Jr., who also designed New York City Hall, the cornerstone of Old Queens was laid in 1809 by the college's third president, the Rev. Ira Condict. Due to financial constraints, construction was not completed until 1825. In its early days, Old Queens provided instruction space for lectures, student and faculty housing, a college library, and a chapel that was shared by three institutions: the college, its grammar school (today, Rutgers Preparatory School), and the New Brunswick Theological Seminary. Today, Old Queens houses the university's administration including the offices of its president and governing boards.

Old Queens was added to the National Register of Historic Places as a National Historical Landmark on May 11, 1976 for its significance in architecture and education. It is regarded as a fine example of Federal architecture on a college campus. Queen's Campus, including Old Queens, was added to the NRHP on July 2, 1973.The building's cupola houses the Old Queens Bell, a gift from Colonel Henry Rutgers, which is traditionally rung only on special occasions such as Commencement and the inauguration of a university president.

== History ==
=== Early history (1766–1808) ===
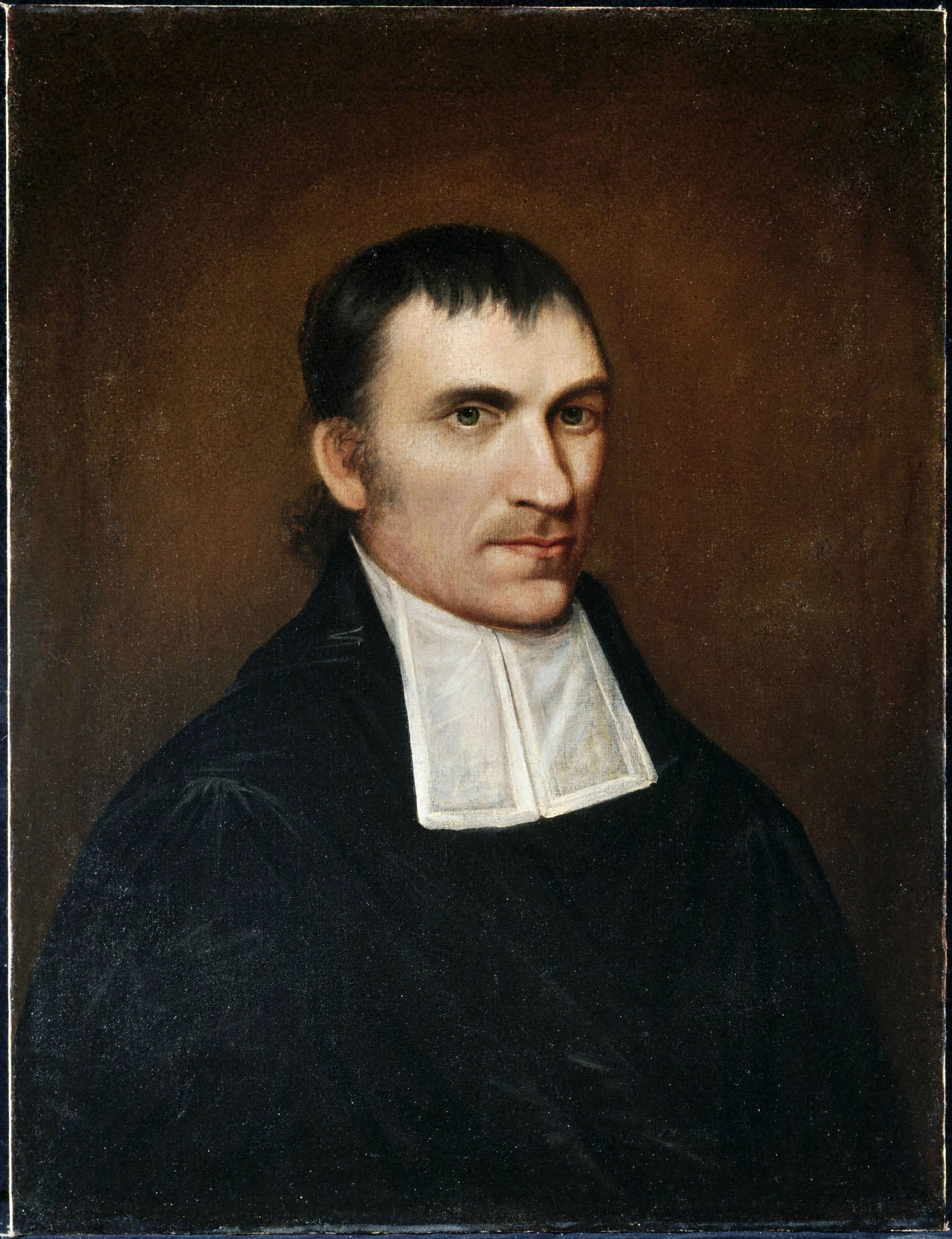
The Rev. Ira Condict, third president of Queen's College, laid the cornerstone for Old Queens on 27 April 1809.

Chartered on 10 November 1766, Queen's College was initially a small, private liberal arts college affiliated with the Dutch Reformed church founded "for the education of youth in the learned languages, liberal and useful arts and sciences, and especially in divinity; preparing them for the ministry and other good offices." It is the eighth-oldest college in the United States and one of the nine Colonial Colleges founded before the American Revolution. Queen's College was named for Charlotte of Mecklenburg-Strelitz, the daughter of a German duke who became the queen consort of British king George III. The college first held its classes in a tavern called "The Sign of the Red Lion" on the corner of Nielson and Albany Streets in New Brunswick, and later at a building on George Street in city's current business district, before moving the college to the hilltop where they would begin to build Old Queens in 1809.

During the Revolution the hilltop where Old Queens was built was the site of a redoubt where Alexander Hamilton, then an artillery captain commanding sixty men of the New York Provincial Company of Artillery, placed his cannons to cover the retreat of George Washington's forces after the British occupation of New York. After the British victory in taking Fort Washington in November 1776, Washington's forces retreated across New Jersey and into Pennsylvania. Hamilton's battery protected the forces as they crossed the Raritan River and passing through New Brunswick in 1776. British forces commanded by Lieutenant General Lord Cornwallis under orders from Lieutenant General William Howe, 5th Viscount Howe pursued Washington as far as New Brunswick.

The hill belonged to John Parker, a prominent merchant from nearby Perth Amboy and was the site of an apple orchard. His heirs, including James Parker, Jr. (1776–1868), a local merchant and political figure, donated this orchard to the trustees of Queen's College (later renamed Rutgers) in 1808. James Parker, Jr., a graduate of Columbia College (A.B. 1793) in New York, was a member of the New Jersey General Assembly, and later became a trustee of Queen's and later Rutgers College starting in 1812 and serving until his death in 1868. The college, which had closed in 1795 due to financial reasons, reopened in 1807 after a long fundraising campaign led by the Rev. Ira Condict (the school's third president, pro tempore) and the Rev. John Henry Livingston (the college's fourth president and founder of the New Brunswick Theological Seminary) with direct support from the Dutch Reformed Church's Synod of New York. The funds would be appropriated to build a permanent home for Queen's College, its grammar school (which remained open for the years the college closed), and Livingston's theological seminary which was permanently relocated to New Brunswick from New York.

=== Construction (1808–1825) ===
The trustees hired New York architect John McComb Jr. (1763–1853) to design and oversee the construction of Old Queens. McComb was known for his designs of the Cape Henry Light (1792) in Chesapeake Bay, and for Montauk Point Lighthouse (1796) and Station Eatons Neck Lighthouse (1798) at the eastern end of Long Island, and for several New York City landmarks including Gracie Mansion (1799), Hamilton Grange (1802), New York City Hall (1803), and St. John's Chapel (1803, demolished 1918). He would subsequently design Lower Manhattan's Castle Clinton (1808) and Alexander Hall at Princeton Theological Seminary (1815).

The cornerstone for Old Queens was laid on 27 April 1809 by Queen's College's president, the Rev. Ira Condict. Construction was overseen by Abraham Blauvelt, publisher of the local newspaper "The Guardian, or, New Brunswick Advertiser." Some the actual physical construction work was done by enslaved persons, including a man named Will who was owned by longtime New Brunswick physician Dr. Jacob Dunham. In recent years, scholarship on the relationship between enslavement and universities has become significantly more publicized. Rutgers has since erected a sign honoring Will’s work and named the brick pathway to the building “Will’s Walk”. This effort acknowledges that slavery was a real part of life in New Brunswick through the nineteenth century.

Due to the young college's financial difficulties, the building was not completed until 1825. Classes began within the completed portions of the building as early as 1811 for Queen's College (now Rutgers University), Queen's College Grammar School (now Rutgers Preparatory School), and the New Brunswick Theological Seminary. The New Brunswick Theological Seminary moved in 1856 to a new 7 acres (2.8 ha) campus less than one-half mile away, as a result of overcrowding. The Grammar School had moved across the street several years earlier in 1830.

In 1825, Colonel Henry Rutgers, an American Revolutionary War Hero and philanthropist from New York City gave the fledgling Queens College a $5,000 bond and a bell. The Trustees renamed the institution in honor of Colonel Rutgers. The bell, known as the Old Queens Bell, was hung in the cupola of Old Queens to chime the passing of classes. It remains there today, and is rung on special occasions, such as at Commencement exercise in May and in recognition of athletic teams who have won national conferences. The cupola was donated by Stephen Van Rensselaer in 1825.

=== Use ===
Initially, Old Queens housed the entire College functionality. The first floor of Old Queens served as classrooms where recitation was held and the second floor housed the college's chapel and library. It was first used in 1811, but was not finished until 1825 when the cupola was added.

The wings on each side of the structure served as living quarters for the faculty of the College. At the time, with no dormitories (until the construction of Winants Hall 1890), students at Rutgers found housing within boarding houses and other off-campus locations throughout New Brunswick.

Today, Old Queens houses the offices of the university president and other top administration. As Rutgers expanded, Old Queens has remained the flagship structure of the University. It houses the highest administrative offices and conference spaces. Old Queens is frequently used as the face of the University in its media and advertising, paying tribute to its architectural and academic significance.

== Architecture ==
Constructed of ashlar brownstone in the front and sides and of local field stone in the rear, the façade of Old Queens incorporates symmetry and balance typical of Federal style architecture, and classical motifs such as Doric pilasters, and low-height pediments (or tympanum or gables) resembling those on ancient Greek and Roman temples typical to the Early American period. The regularized brownstone on the facade is the most expensive style of New Jersey Dutch tradition.

Old Queens boasts its original handmade glass windowpanes. The lower floor windows are 12x8, with 16x12 on the second and 12x12 third floors. In each of the gables, circular windows, typical to Federal architecture are present.

A cupola erected in 1825, topped by a weathervane, houses the Old Queens Bell donated by Colonel Henry Rutgers. Its exterior maintains almost entirely the same appearance it had at its construction. The facade of Old Queens remains recognizable to Rutgers students from the nineteenth century through today.

== Queen's Campus ==
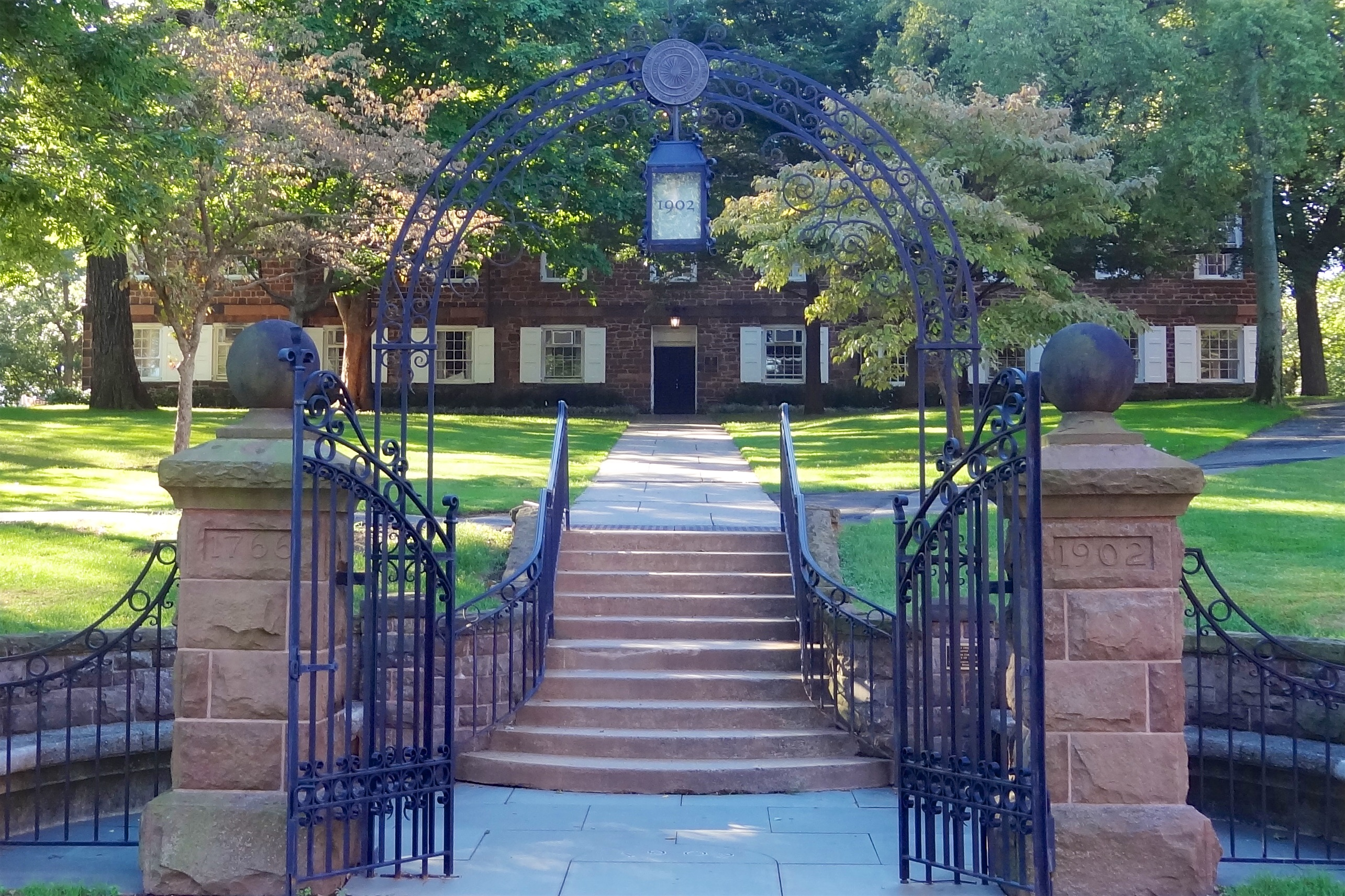
Class of 1902 Memorial Gateway leading to the Queens Campus, Old Queens is in the background.

Old Queens is the oldest building and the centerpiece of the six extant building which constitute the Queen's Campus. The historic core of the university, it contains the university's oldest buildings. While the Old Queens building obtained a discrete separate listing on the National Register of Historic Places for landmark status in 1976, the entire six-acre campus with these six remaining buildings was included together as one historic site on the New Jersey Register of Historic Places on January 29, 1973, and on the National Register of Historic Places on July 2, 1973. These six buildings are:

- Old Queens (built 1809–1825)
- Van Nest Hall (1845)
- Daniel S. Schanck Observatory (1865)
- Geology Hall (1872)
- Kirkpatrick Chapel (1873)
- Winants Hall (1890)

A seventh building, the former "President's House" (built in 1841), was demolished in 1948 after damage sustained during a hurricane. Used as the residence of the college's president in the nineteenth century, it was later used as a fine arts building before it was razed.

The Old Queens campus is accessed through four gateways, the Henry Rutgers Baldwin Gateway (erected 1901) on College Avenue, named for Henry Rutgers Baldwin (Class of 1849), the Class of 1883 Memorial Gateway (erected in 1904) at the corner of George and Somerset Streets, the Class of 1882 Gateway (erected 1907) at the corner of Somerset Street and College Avenue, and the Class of 1902 Memorial Gateway (erected in 1904) on Hamilton Street leading to the Voorhees Mall and the academic buildings on Rutgers University's College Avenue Campus. It is through this last gate that graduating seniors walk during Commencement exercises in May.

Located in front of Old Queens, the Class of 1877 Cannon commemorates both the Rutgers-Princeton Cannon War and several alumni who have served in the United States military. As a tradition during commencement, those graduating break clay pipes over the cannon as a symbol of breaking ties with their "pipe dreams" of youth and embarking into adulthood.
