= Rutgers University traditions and customs =

As one of the first nine colleges founded in the United States of America—founded as Queen's College in 1766 (a decade before the country's independence from Great Britain)—Rutgers, The State University of New Jersey' has two-and-a-half centuries of tradition and heritage.

== School spirit ==
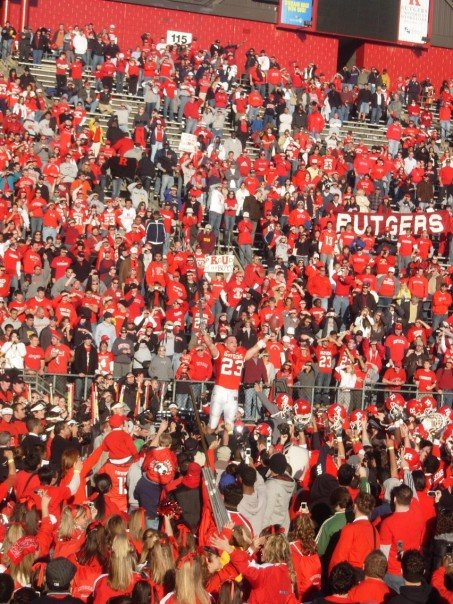
Rutgers Scarlet Knights fullback No. 23 Brian Leonard (class of 2007), conducts the band as it plays the alma mater, "On the Banks of the Old Raritan" after his last home game against Syracuse University on November 25, 2006.

=== Current mascot ===
The official mascot of the Rutgers Scarlet Knights is Sir Henry, the Scarlet Knight.

=== Colors, mottoes and prior mascots ===
Rutgers University's only school color is scarlet. Initially, students sought to make orange the school color, citing Rutgers' Dutch heritage and in reference to the Prince of Orange. The Rutgers student publication Targum (which would go on to become The Daily Targum) first proposed that scarlet be adopted in May 1869, claiming that it was a striking color and because scarlet ribbon was easily obtained. During the first intercollegiate football game with Princeton on November 6, 1869, the players from Rutgers wore scarlet-colored turbans and handkerchiefs to distinguish them as a team from the Princeton players. The Board of Trustees officially made scarlet the school color in 1900.

In its early days, Rutgers athletes were known informally as "The Scarlet" in reference to the school color, or as "Queensmen" in reference to the institution's first name, Queen's College. In 1925, the mascot was changed to Chanticleer, a fighting rooster from the medieval fable Reynard the Fox (Le Roman de Renart) which was used by Geoffrey Chaucer's in the Canterbury Tales. At the time, the student humor magazine at Rutgers was called Chanticleer, and one of its early arts editors, Ozzie Nelson (later of The Adventures of Ozzie and Harriet fame) was quarterback of the Rutgers team from 1924 to 1926. The Chanticleer mascot was unveiled at a football game against Lafayette College, in which Lafayette was also introducing a new mascot, a leopard. However, the choice of Chanticleer as a mascot was often the subject of ridicule because of its association with "being chicken". In 1955, the mascot was changed to the Scarlet Knight after a campus-wide election, beating out other contenders such as "Queensmen", the "Scarlet", the "Red Lions", the "Redmen" and the "Flying Dutchmen". Earlier proposed nicknames included "Pioneers" and "Cannoneers". When Harvey Harman, then coach of the football team, was asked why he supported changing the Rutgers mascot, he was quoted as saying, "You can call it the Chanticleer, you can call it a fighting cock, you can call it any damn thing you want, but everybody knows it's a chicken." Harman later is said to have bought the first "Scarlet Knight" mascot costume for the 1955 season, which was to be his final season as football coach at Rutgers.

Rutgers' motto, Sol iustitiae et occidentem illustra (translated as "Sun of righteousness, shine upon the West also") is derived from the motto of the University of Utrecht in The Netherlands, which is Sol Iustitiae Illustra Nos (translated as "Sun of Justice, shine upon us"). It is a reference to the biblical texts of Malachi 4:2 and Matthew 13:43. This motto appears in the university's seal (pictured above), which is also derived from that of the University of Utrecht, and depicts a multi-pointed sun.

==== Coat of arms ====
The shield of the Rutgers coat of arms appears on the university gonfalon, and is at the head of all processions. The first quarter bears the arms of Nassau, the House of Orange, and recognizes the Dutch founders. The arms in the upper sinister quarter are those of George III combined with Queen Charlotte's. It was George III who granted the Charter of 1766 to Queen's College, named in honor of Charlotte of Mecklenburg, King George's consort. The arms shown on the sinister half are Queen Charlotte's. The third quarter from the Seal of the State of New Jersey. The fourth quarter is the coat of arms of Colonel Henry Rutgers.

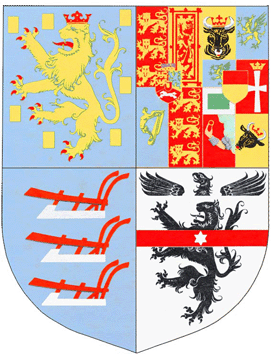
The university coat of arms (or shield) is used during all academic processions

==== Seal ====
The University Seal based on that of the University of Utrecht in the Netherlands whose motto around a sun is "Sol iustitiae nos illustra": "Sun of righteousness, shine upon us". Rutgers modified the Utrecht seal to read "Sol iustitiae et occidentem illustra"; embracing the Western world, meaning "Sun of righteousness, shine upon the West also." The boards of governors and trustees approved a revised seal for the university 1997 that includes the words "Rutgers, The State University of New Jersey" and adds the 1766 founding date.

=== School songs and chants ===
Several school songs are connected with the school's athletic heritage. The alma mater of Rutgers University is On the Banks of the Old Raritan with words written by Howard Fullerton (Rutgers Class of 1874) and adapted to an old Scottish melody On the Banks of the Old Dundee. It is typically performed at the close of athletic events by the university's marching band, the Marching Scarlet Knights (also called "The Pride of New Jersey"), at Rutgers University Glee Club concerts, commencement and other important school events. The university's fight song, The Bells Must Ring, is performed often during athletic events especially in recognition of notable scores. Written in 1931 for entry in a student song contest, pianist Richard M. Hadden (Rutgers Class of 1932) composed the song with W. E. Sanford (Rutgers Class of 1930). Between the verses of the fight song, the spirit chant is rhythmically shouted.

R-U Rah Rah!
R-U Rah Rah!
Hoo-Rah! Hoo-Rah!
Rutgers, Rah!
Upstream, Red Team!
Red Team; upstream!
(Men) Rah! (Women) Woo! (Men) Rah! (Women) Woo! (All) Rutgers, Rah!

This chant is one of many recited during Rutgers athletic events. Another popular chant—a "call-and-response" in which one side of the stadium crowd calls out "R" and the other side of the stadium responds with "U" antiphonally, (shorthanded for "Rutgers University") is often performed. Though has not been performed in the modern era, the original spirit chant used at Rutgers was "Rah! Rah! Rah! Bow-wow-wow! Rutgers!"

In a songbook and in sheet music published by Shapiro, Bernstein & Co. in 1936, the song Loyal Sons of Rutgers was found. The music was attributed to Philip Bliss, and the lyrics in the sheet music were added by Ozzie Nelson (Rutgers Class of '27.) Nelson used it as an early theme song for his radio show. The lyrics as published in the songbook may or may not be the ones Nelson added. They are:

Loyal sons of Rutgers, battling
'Mid the shadows of the twilight,
For the prestige of old Rutgers,
On the gridiron now they fight.

Chorus:

Ring the bells of old Queen's College,
Paint the town as ne'er before!
Play the game, boys, play together!
Score once more, oh, score once more.

Second Verse:

Hit the lines and run the ends boys,
Play the game with heart and soul.
Right on through, at ev'ry plunge, boys,
Push the ball across the goal

(repeat chorus)

Other notable songs include Nobody ever died for Dear Old Rutgers composed by Jule Styne to lyrics by Sammy Cahn from the 1947 musical High Button Shoes parodies an 1892 game in which Frank "Pop" Grant, a Rutgers football player, was being taken from the field because of injuries and stated that he would "die for dear old Rutgers." Other's sources state that the player stated "I will die if somebody does not give me a cigarette." The song Loyal Sons which exhorts Rutgers athletes (particularly football players) to "hit the line and run the ends boys...Score once more. Oh score once more."

=== Athletic rivalry ===
Rutgers maintains athletic rivalries with other collegiate institutions. The university has a historic rivalry with Princeton University, Seton Hall University, and Columbia University (formerly King's College) originating from the early days of college football. While they maintain this rivalry in other sports, the football rivalry series with Princeton was discontinued after the 1980 series "at the request of Princeton officials, who felt that Rutgers' step toward big‐time football in recent seasons had taken the Scarlet Knights out of the Tigers' desired class of competition." Rutgers has a basketball rivalry with Seton Hall University.

== College pranks ==
=== Rutgers-Princeton Cannon War ===
A few intrepid Rutgers students painting the cannon on the Princeton University campus

Howard Fullerton goes down in Rutgers history not only for penning the alma mater, but also for allegedly inspiring the theft of a cannon from the campus of Princeton University on April 25, 1875, an event—and the ensuing debate between the two university presidents—reported sensationally in nationwide newspapers. The cannon was believed to have belonged to Rutgers when used in battle during the American Revolution. Under the cover of night, a dozen Rutgers students, stole the cannon from its place at Princeton, and brought it back by wagon to New Brunswick before the following dawn. In retaliation, Princeton students raided the Rutgers Armory and stole a few muskets. Reputedly—though this may have been baseless rhetoric originating from the heated debate after the theft—the Rutgers students are accused of having stolen the wrong cannon. Eventually the committee appointed by the two colleges recommended the return of the stolen items to their owners. When the cannon was returned, Princeton University officials ordered it buried in the ground, encased in cement, with only a few feet of the butt end exposed above ground.

Several Rutgers students attempted to repeat the crime, unsuccessfully, in October 1946, attaching one end of a length of heavy chain to the cannon and the other to their Ford. Surprised by Princeton men and the local constabulary, they gunned the engine of the Ford so viciously that the car was torn in half. The Rutgers students managed to escape, but with neither the car nor the cannon.

To this day, intrepid Rutgers students journey the 16 miles to Princeton University to place their declaration of ownership of the cannon by painting the cannon scarlet red. There are two cannons on Cannon Green behind Nassau Hall at Princeton. Today, a cannon is placed in the ground before Old Queens at Rutgers, by the class of 1877, memorializing both this event and several alumni in the armed services who were killed in action.

== Around campus ==
=== Statue of William the Silent ===
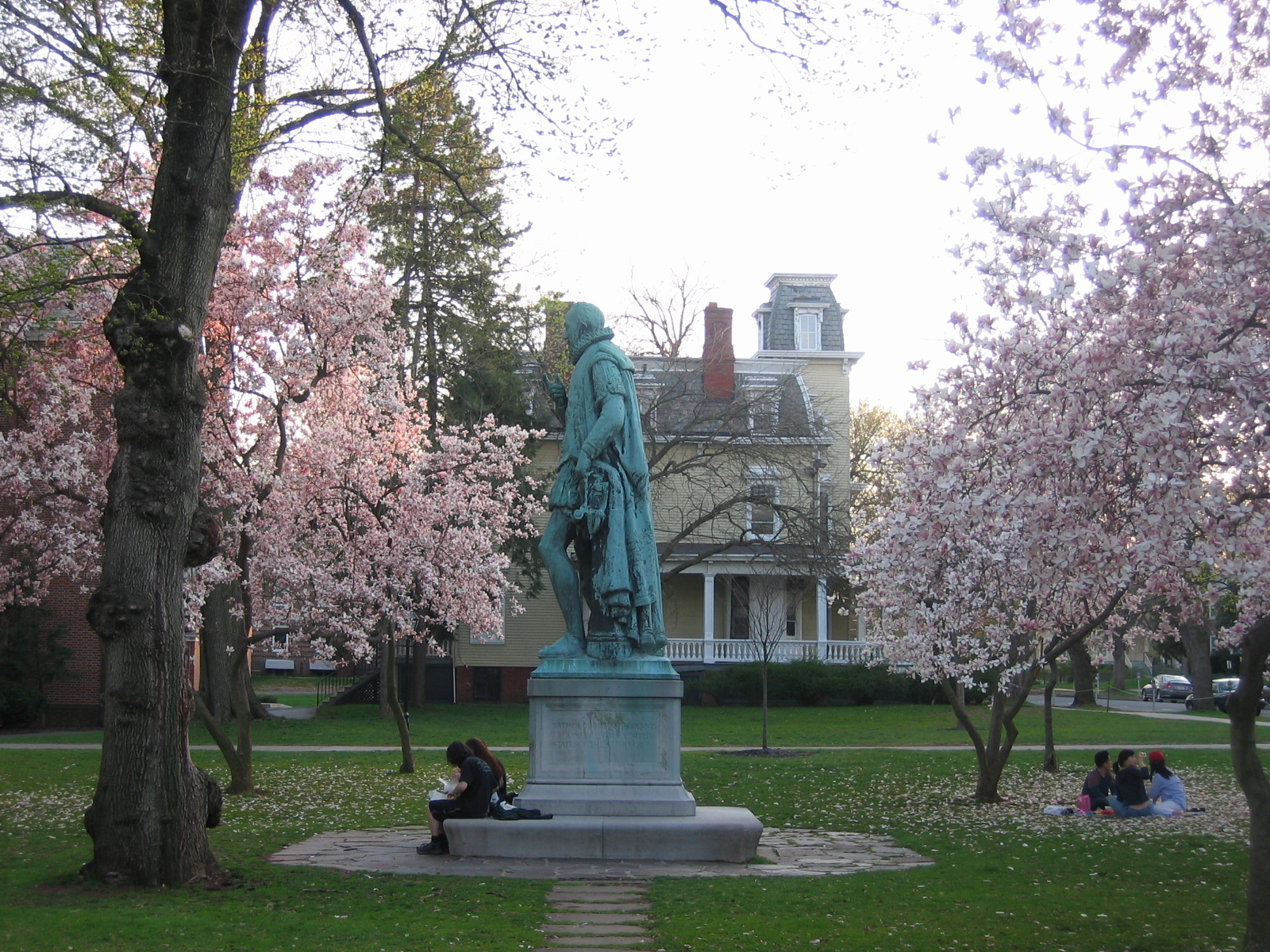
Statue of Prince William the Silent on the Voorhees Mall

Fenton B. Turck, a New York physician and biologist, with the assistance of railroad magnate, and longtime Rutgers trustee Leonor F. Loree (RC 1877), anonymously donated a statue of William of Orange (William I, Prince of Orange, 1533–1584) commonly known as William the Silent, who was the leader of the Dutch rebellion against the Spanish that set off the Eighty Years' War and resulted in the formal independence of the United Provinces in 1648. Turck, of Dutch extraction, intended to give the statue known familiarly as " Willie the Silent" to the university to signify the institution's Dutch roots. He kept the statue in the basement of his laboratory in Manhattan for eight years before it was unveiled on the Voorhees Mall on June 9, 1928.

This statue is a rough replica of a similar monument that stands in The Hague.

=== Passion Puddle ===
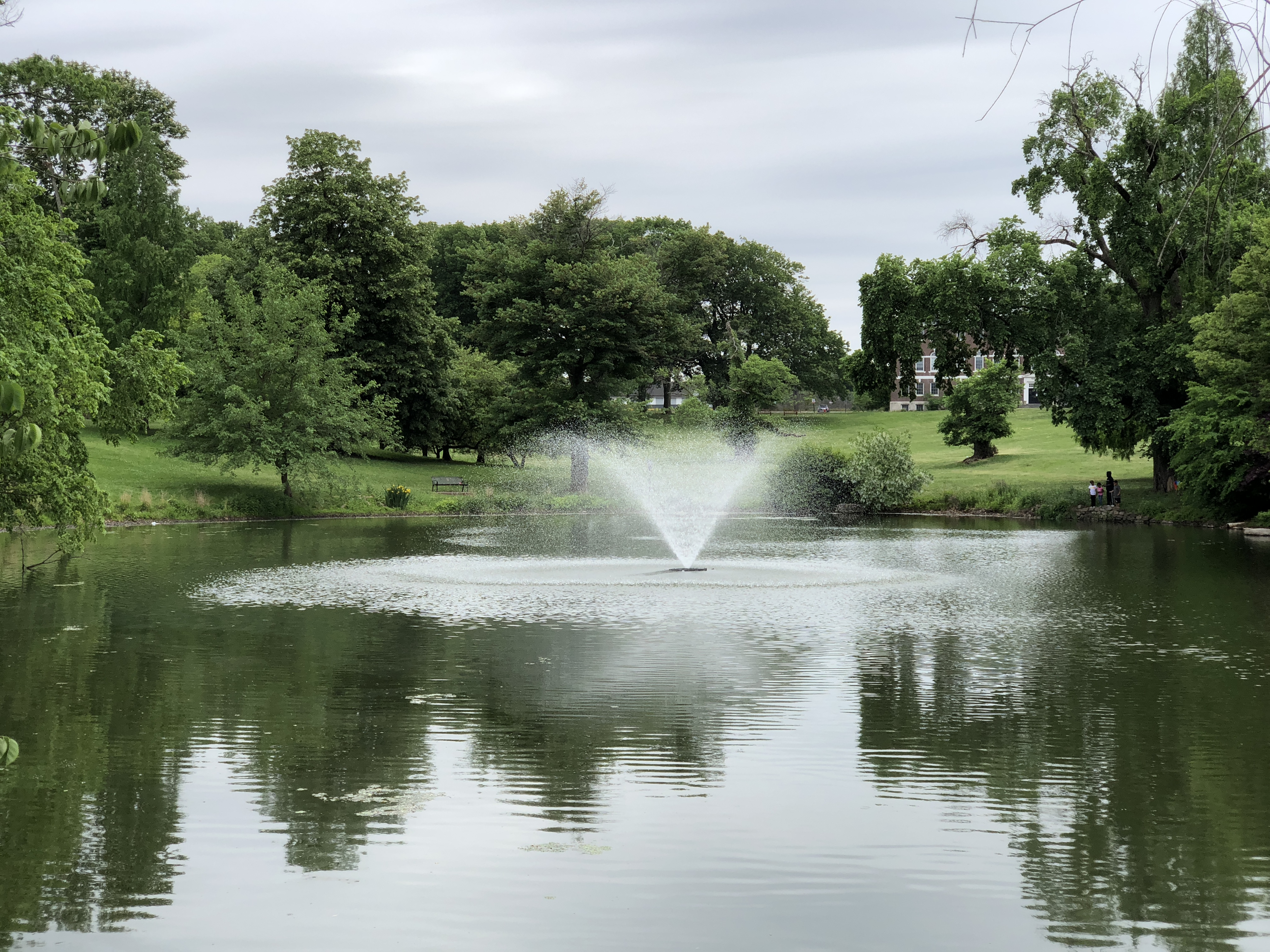
Passion Puddle

Passion Puddle is a small, tree-shaded pond on Douglass campus. According to legend, if one circles the pond three times with their romantic interest, they will be married within a year. Traditionally, if a Douglass College girl and a Cook College boy circle it three times, they are meant to live happily ever after.

== Commencement ==
At Commencement exercises in the spring, tradition leads undergraduates to break clay pipes over the Class of 1877 Cannon monument in front of Old Queens, symbolizing the breaking of ties with the college, and leaving behind the good times of one's undergraduate years. This symbolic gesture dates back to when pipe-smoking was fashionable among undergraduates, and many college memories were of evenings of pipe smoking and revelry with friends.

During commencement exercises, graduating seniors walk in academic procession under the Class of 1902 Memorial Gateway (erected in 1904) on Hamilton Street leading to the Voorhees Mall where the ceremonies were held for Rutgers College. Traditionally, students are warned to avoid walking beneath the gate before commencement over a superstition that one who does will not graduate in four years.

== Recent customs and annual events ==
=== Rutgers Day ===
Rutgers Day began in 1906 and has been held under the name "Rutgers Day" since 2009. The event has been quite popular, with some 50,000 people estimated to have shown up to the first one. During a Rutgers Day festival, the departments and schools of Rutgers put on exhibits and displays for the general public, producing what is, in effect, an enormous one-day carnival. Rutgers Day now contains the New Jersey Folk Festival within it, which is an older annual event that happens on Douglass Campus, and which has been going on since the mid-1970s.

The first Rutgers Day as such took place Saturday, April 25, 2009, from 10 a.m. to 4 p.m., and attracted 50,000 visitors to university campuses in New Brunswick and Piscataway, N.J.

Rutgers Day expanded on the university's long-standing traditions of Rutgers Agricultural Field Day and the New Jersey Folk Festival, which also occurred that day. The day featured performances, tours, exhibits, hands-on activities, lectures, demonstrations, children's programs and more aimed at the general public, parents and children, teens, current and prospective students, and alumni.

For thirty years, through 2011, there was an annual concert called Rutgersfest, typically held on Busch or Livingston campus. The concert had novelties and stands nearby, and people from outside the campus came to crowd in and dance near the band. The concert met its demise when students and others got rowdy in New Brunswick after the 2011 Rutgersfest.

Since 2003, there has been an annual camp out/protest called Tent State University. This is held on Voorhees Mall, and began in 2003 in response to proposed education budget cuts and tuition increases. While other colleges and campuses hold Tent State camp outs/protests, the movement began at Rutgers.

The Grease Trucks have been called a Rutgers institution, and so eating at those trucks can be said to be a Rutgers tradition. Those trucks served sandwiches with various names, such as Fat Cat, Fat Sam, and Fat Darrell. The trucks previously occupied a space besides Alexander Library on College Avenue Campus, but it was permanently removed by Rutgers by not renewing their license for the 2017 year because The Yard, the new College Avenue Apartments had opened with stores. "RU Hungry", the grease trucks, now have a store located at The Yard across from Scott Hall now. Rutgers did not renew their operating license.

== See also ==
- Rutgers University
- Athletics at Rutgers University
- History of Rutgers University
- History of New Jersey
