= Rutgers Day =

Annual university festival

Coordinates: 40.5001397434508°N 74.44802201119204°W

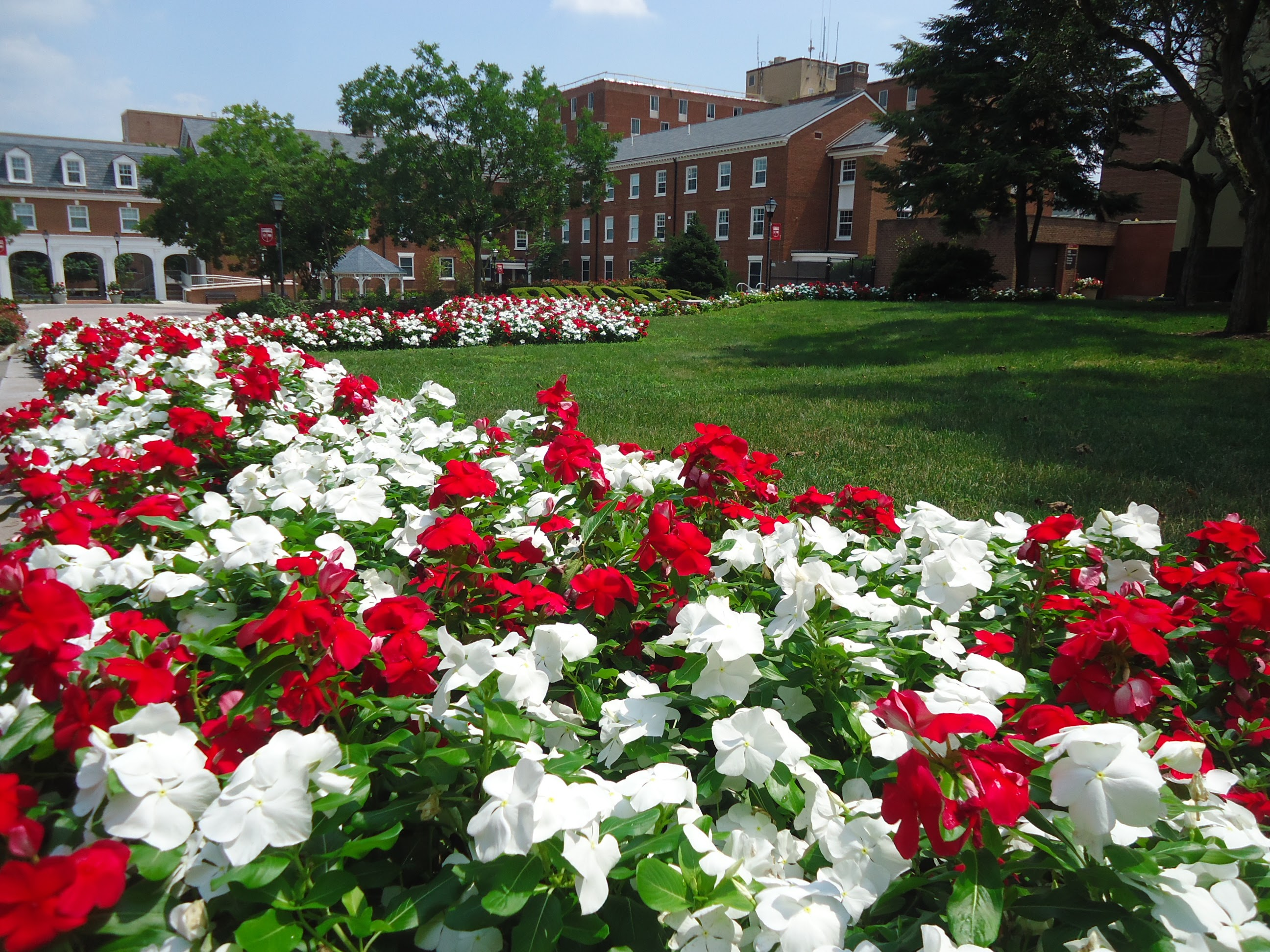
- Rutgers University in New Brunswick, New Jersey
- Dates: Last Saturday in April, rain or shine (next: April 26, 2025)
- Begins: 10 am
- Ends: 4 pm
- Frequency: Annual
- Locations: Three Rutgers University campuses in New Brunswick and Piscataway
- Inaugurated: 1906 (titled “Rutgers Day” in 2009)
- Participants: Musicians, food vendors, craft vendors, students, faculty, dancers, scientists, researchers, educators, families, student-athletes, Sir Henry, the Scarlet Knight
- Website: newbrunswick.rutgers.edu/rutgers-day

Rutgers Day is a festival held on the last Saturday in April every year at Rutgers University.

== Background ==
The event typically brings in tens of thousands of festival-goers onto Rutgers campus. Open to the general public, it offers approximately 500 free programs that feature scientific demonstrations, child-friendly interactive activities involving animals and plants, student performances, cultural traditions, exhibits, food vendors, football scrimmage, and live music. Free shuttle buses run between sites during the day. The Rutgers Day parade, led by the Marching Scarlet Knights, typically takes place starting at 10:30am along Seminary Place.

== History ==
What is now the Rutgers Day tradition started in 1906 as an agricultural field day for farmers to learn about the New Jersey Agricultural Experiment Station and its studies. The late Linda Bassett, who worked in community affairs at the university, helped create an annual event for the state’s residents to learn about and experience the university, starting in 2009.Since that year, Ag Field Day has been held as a part of Rutgers Day.

== Ag Field Day at Rutgers Day ==
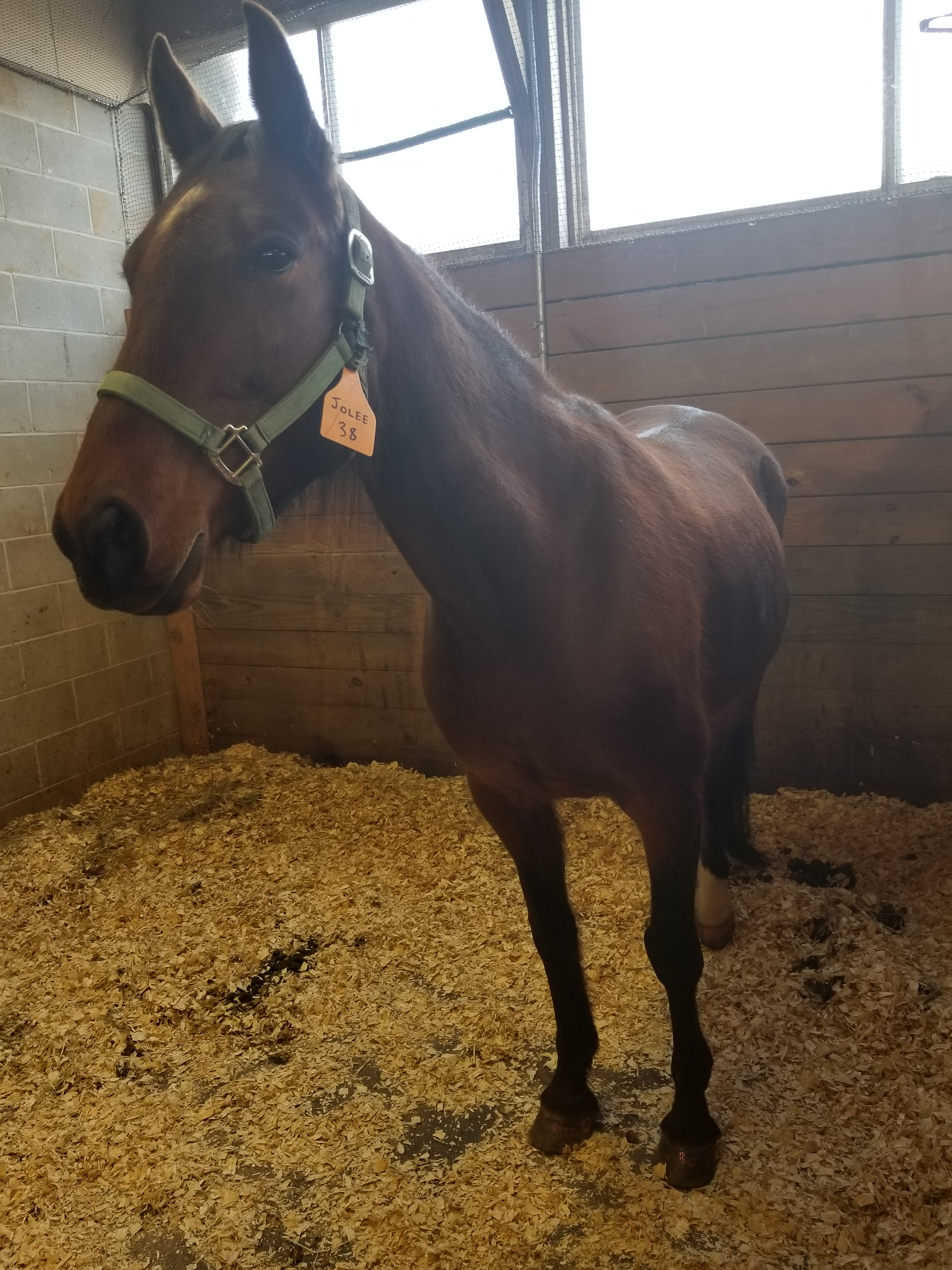
A campus horse in a barn at Rutgers SEBS.

Rutgers Agricultural Field Day, known as “Ag Field Day,” is a farm-oriented event held by the School of Environmental and Biological Sciences (SEBS) at Rutgers Day on Rutgers University's Cook Campus in New Brunswick, New Jersey. The SEBS event includes 4-H animal fairs, a petting zoo, farm tours, plant sales, evolutionary and archaeological displays, and department-specific exhibits such as the entomology department's cockroach races.

The plant sale next to Bartlett Hall and the Marine Science Building, held by the Department of Plant Biology at SEBS, attracts attendees from across the region to purchase unique and popular varieties of vegetables and herbs as well as many other plants. “The selection of plants draws gardeners from three states away, resulting in a huge diversity of traditional and heirloom plants.” Tours of the Floriculture Greenhouse Complex, a teaching greenhouse in the Department of Plant Biology, are also conducted.

== The New Jersey Folk Festival at Rutgers Day ==
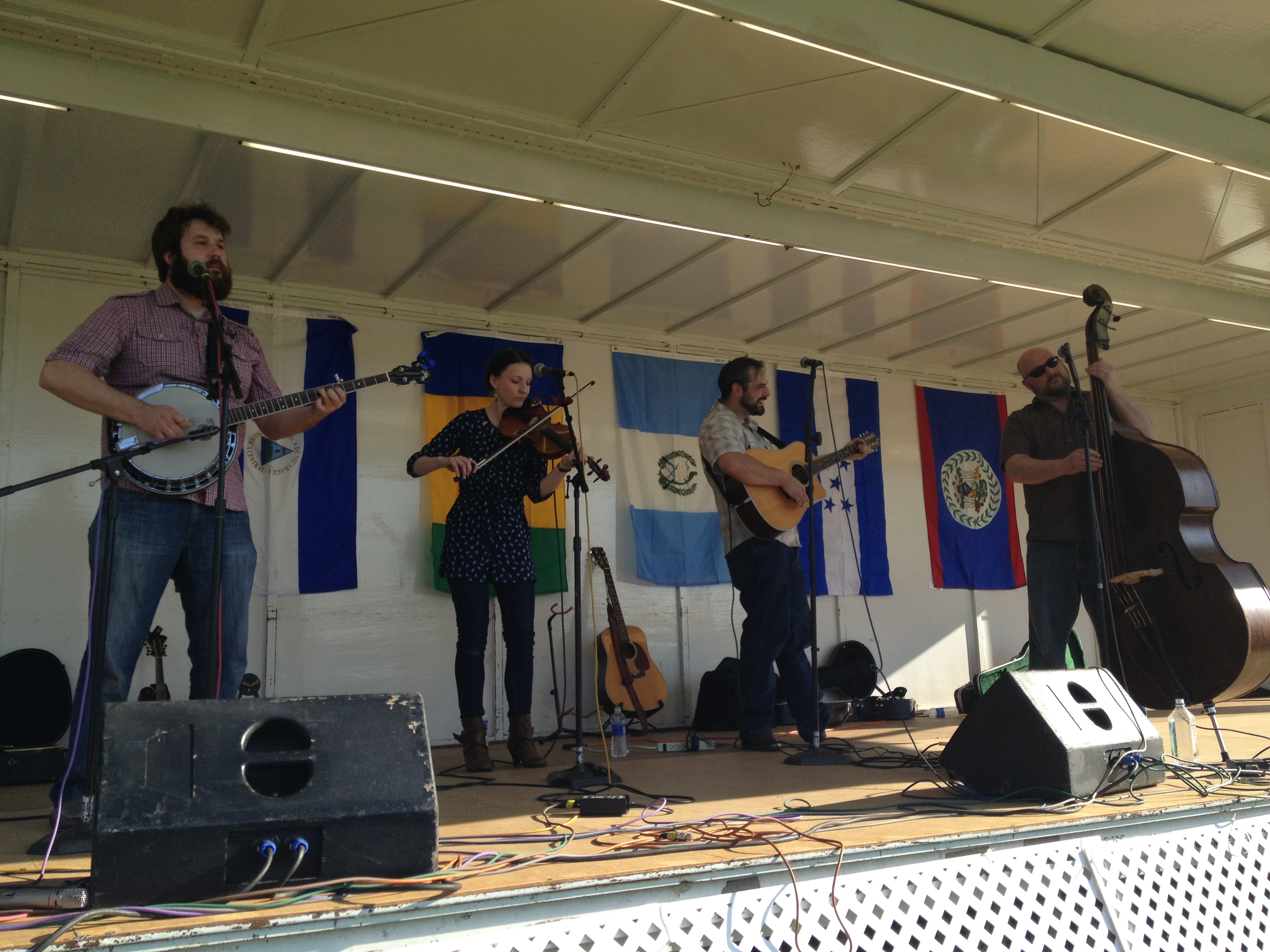
A bluegrass-influenced folk band performing at the New Jersey Folk Festival

The New Jersey Folk Festival is an annual folk music and cultural festival held on the Douglass Campus during Rutgers Day. Traditionally held on the Great Lawn at the Wood Lawn mansion, home to the Eagleton Institute of Politics, in 2024 it moved to the lawn at Passion Puddle, a small pond that is said to result in a future happy marriage together for student couples who circle it three times while holding hands. Established in 1975, the New Jersey Folk Festival at Rutgers Day typically presents the traditional music, crafts, art and food vendors of the various cultural communities within the state and its surrounding region.

== Other live music ==
In addition to the folk festival, the festival is the site of other live music. WRSU 88.7 FM Rutgers Radio helps present live musical performances by various local bands and other acts on stage at the festival's College Avenue Campus. Performers from the university's arts conservatory, Mason Gross, entertain audiences as well.

== Science, business and health care ==
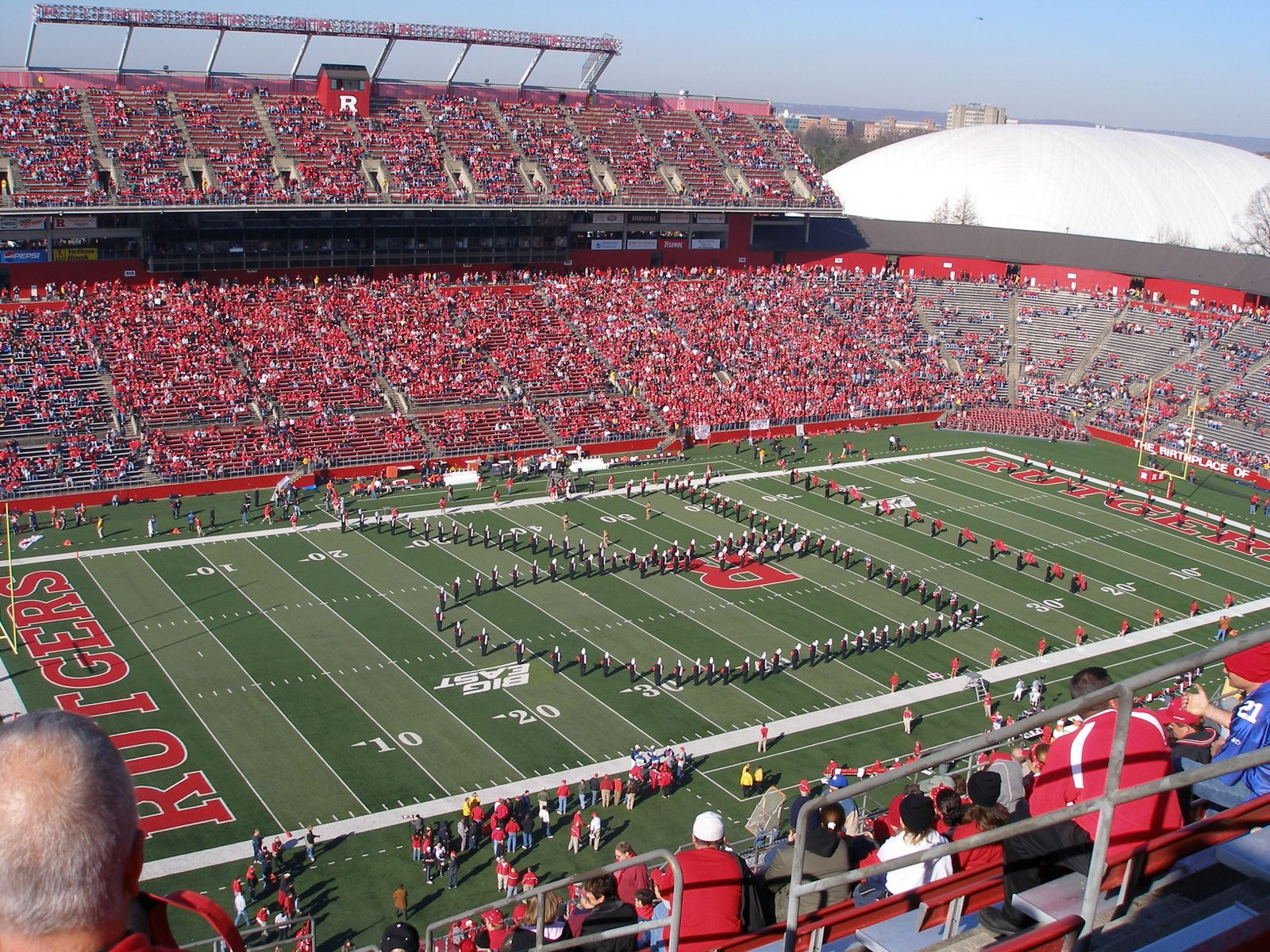
Rutgers’ SHI Stadium on the Busch Campus in Piscataway, New Jersey.

In addition to the biological and environmental scientific displays on Cook Campus, technology, business, engineering, medical, health care, chemistry, physics and other scientific exhibits and activities are typically held at Busch Campus.

== Athletics at Rutgers Day ==
The Athletics Department offers activities on College Avenue Campus in the grassy Voorhees Mall area during Rutgers Day, with student-athletes from some of Rutgers' 24 varsity sports present along with mascot Sir Henry, the Scarlet Knight.

Rutgers Scarlet Knights football kicks off its Scarlet-White Spring Game, a free pre-season spring scrimmage event, toward the afternoon conclusion of each Rutgers Day at SHI Stadium on Busch Campus. The event has featured a pre-game “Rutgers Boardwalk” carnival-style area at the stadium with rides and games. The event includes a university marching band performance by the Marching Scarlet Knights.

== Museums and other tours ==
Tours of the Zimmerli Art Museum and the Rutgers Geology Museum are conducted at the event.

== See also ==
- New Brunswick, New Jersey music scene
- Rutgers University student organizations

== See also ==
- Corefest (small indie music festival by college radio on Livingston Campus)
