= Rutgers Scarlet Knights =

Intercollegiate sports teams of Rutgers University

- University: Rutgers University–New Brunswick
- Nickname: Scarlet Knights
- NCAA: Division I (FBS)
- Conference: Big Ten
- Athletic director: Keli Zinn
- Location: Piscataway, New Jersey
- Varsity teams: 24
- Football stadium: SHI Stadium
- Basketball arena: Jersey Mike's Arena
- Baseball stadium: Bainton Field
- Soccer stadium: Yurcak Field
- Other venues: Bauer Track & Field Complex, College Avenue Gym, Rutgers University Golf Course
- Colors: Scarlet
- Mascot: Sir Henry, the Scarlet Knight
- Fight song: The Bells Must Ring
- Website: scarletknights.com/index.aspx

The Rutgers Scarlet Knights are the athletic teams that represent Rutgers University's New Brunswick campus. Rutgers is famously known for being the "Birthplace of College Football," as it hosted the first ever intercollegiate football game on November 6, 1869, in which Rutgers defeated a team from the College of New Jersey (now Princeton University) with a score of 6 runs to 4.

Among the first American schools that participate in intercollegiate athletics, Rutgers currently fields 24 teams in the Big Ten Conference, which participates in Division I competition, as sanctioned by the National Collegiate Athletic Association (NCAA) in the following sports: baseball, basketball, cross country, field hockey, football, golf, gymnastics, lacrosse, rowing, soccer, softball, tennis, track and field, swimming and diving, wrestling, and volleyball. The athletic programs compete under the name "Scarlet Knights", after the Rutgers University mascot, Sir Henry, that was chosen in 1955 by the student body.

The Rutgers campuses in Newark and Camden also participate in intercollegiate competition — under the names "Scarlet Raiders" and "Scarlet Raptors", respectively — in NCAA Division III.

== Athletic heritage ==
Rutgers was among the first American institutions to engage in intercollegiate athletics. Organized sports at Rutgers started with the Rutgers Men's Crew Team in 1864. In addition, the university participated in a small circle of schools that included Yale University, Columbia University and long-time rival, Princeton University (then called The College of New Jersey). The four schools met at the Fifth Avenue Hotel in Manhattan on October 19, 1873, to establish a set of rules governing their intercollegiate competition, and particularly to codify the new game of football. Though invited, Harvard University chose not to attend. In the early years of intercollegiate athletics, the circle of schools that participated in these athletic events were located solely in the American Northeast. However, by the turn of the century, colleges and universities across the United States also began to participate.

The first intercollegiate athletic event at Rutgers was a baseball game on May 2, 1866, against Princeton in which they suffered a 40–2 loss. Rutgers University is often referred to as The Birthplace of College Football as the first intercollegiate football game was held on College Field between Rutgers and Princeton on November 6, 1869, in New Brunswick, New Jersey. The game was played on a plot of ground where the present-day College Avenue Gymnasium now stands (although the game was based more on soccer than on rugby, unlike the current version of American football, which takes its rules from a rugby-based framework). Rutgers won the game, with a score of 6 goals to Princeton's 4. (roughly 36-24 currently). According to Parke H. Davis, the 1869 Rutgers football team shared the national title with Princeton.

For much of its athletic history starting in 1866, Rutgers remained unaffiliated with any formal athletic conference and was classified as "independent". From 1946 to 1951, the university was a member of the Middle Three Conference, along with Lafayette and Lehigh. Rutgers considered petitioning to join the Ivy League at the formation of that conference in 1954. From 1958 to 1961, Rutgers was a member of the Middle Atlantic Conference. From 1976 to 1995, Rutgers was a member of the Atlantic 10 Conference for most sports while being an Eastern Independent in football.

Rutgers remained independent until 1991 when it joined the Big East Conference for football. All sports programs at Rutgers subsequently became affiliated with the Big East in 1995. On July 1, 2014, Rutgers became a member of the Big Ten athletic conference, after paying an $11.5 million exit fee to the American Athletic Conference (which formed as a result of the splitting of the Big East Conference).

While in the Big East, the Scarlet Knights won four conference tournament titles: men's soccer (1997), baseball (2000, 2007), and women's basketball (2007). Several other teams have won regular season titles, but failed to win the conference's championship tournament. Recently, the Rutgers Scarlet Knights football team has achieved success on the gridiron after several years of losing seasons. They were invited to the Insight Bowl on December 27, 2005, but lost 45 to 40 against Arizona State. This was Rutgers' first bowl appearance since a December 16, 1978, loss against Arizona State. The score of the game was 34 to 18 at the Garden State Bowl against ASU (which was the first bowl game in which Rutgers was a participant). In 2006, the Scarlet Knights were invited to the inaugural Texas Bowl, in Houston, Texas, in which they defeated the Kansas State Wildcats 37 to 10. On January 5, 2008, Rutgers faced Ball State in the International Bowl held in Toronto, making it their third straight bowl game for the first time in the program's history. They won the game 52–30. Following the 2008 regular season, Rutgers was invited to the Papajohns.com Bowl, where on December 29, 2008, they defeated the North Carolina State University Wolfpack by a score of 29 to 23 for their third straight bowl win. On December 19, 2009, the Scarlet Knights won their fourth straight bowl game by defeating the University of Central Florida 45–28 in the St. Petersburg Bowl. On December 20, 2011, Rutgers faced Iowa State in the Pinstripe Bowl and beat them 27 to 13. On December 28, 2013, the Rutgers Scarlet Knights faced the Notre Dame Fighting Irish in the New Era Pinstripe Bowl, which they lost 16 to 29. On December 26, 2014, Rutgers played in the Quick Lane Bowl vs the North Carolina Tar Heels in a 40–21 victory. On December 31, 2021, The Scarlet Knights lost to Wake Forest 38–10 in the Taxslayer Gator Bowl. On December 28, 2023, Rutgers played in their most recent bowl game, winning against the Miami Hurricanes in the 13th Bad Boy Mowers Pinstripe bowl, Final Score being 31-24.

== School spirit ==
=== Colors and prior mascots ===
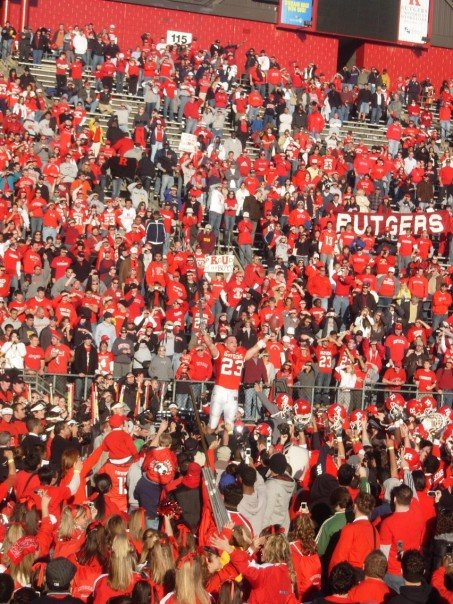
Rutgers Scarlet Knights fullback No. 23 Brian Leonard (class of 2007) pumping up the crowd at Senior Day events during the Rutgers vs. Syracuse football game, November 25, 2006

Rutgers University's school color is scarlet. Initially, students sought to make orange the school color, citing Rutgers' Dutch heritage and in reference to the Prince of Orange. The Daily Targum first proposed that scarlet be adopted in May 1869, claiming that it was a striking color and because scarlet ribbon was easily obtained. During the first intercollegiate football game with Princeton on November 6, 1869, the players from Rutgers wore scarlet-colored turbans and handkerchiefs to distinguish them as a team from the Princeton players. The Board of Trustees officially made scarlet the school colors in 1900.

In its early days, Rutgers athletes were known informally as "The Scarlet" in reference to the school color, or as "Queensmen" in reference to the institution's first name, Queen's College. In 1925, the mascot was changed to Chanticleer, a fighting rooster from the medieval fable Reynard the Fox (Le Roman de Renart) which was used by Geoffrey Chaucer in the Canterbury Tales. At the time, the student humor magazine at Rutgers was called Chanticleer, and one of its early arts editors, Ozzie Nelson (later of The Adventures of Ozzie and Harriet fame), was quarterback of the Rutgers team from 1924 to 1926. The Chanticleer mascot was unveiled at a football game against Lafayette College, in which Lafayette was also introducing a new mascot, a leopard.

Big Ten logo in Rutgers' colors

However, the choice of Chanticleer as a mascot was often the subject of ridicule because of its association with "being chicken". In 1955, the mascot was changed to the Scarlet Knight after a campus-wide election, beating out other contenders such as "Queensmen", the "Scarlet", the "Red Lions", the "Redmen" and the "Flying Dutchmen." Earlier proposed nicknames included "Pioneers" and "Cannoneers". When Harvey Harman, then coach of the football team, was asked why he supported changing the Rutgers mascot, he was quoted as saying, "You can call it the Chanticleer, you can call it a fighting cock, you can call it any damn thing you want, but everybody knows it's a chicken."

=== Current mascot ===
Sir Henry, the Scarlet Knight is the current mascot of the team. Coach Harman is said to have bought the first "Scarlet Knight" mascot costume for the 1955 season, which was to be his final season as football coach at Rutgers.

The student that wears the Scarlet Knight costume remains anonymous, and may not admit to being the scarlet knight during his term. Rutgers clubs that seek to rent the Scarlet Knight may do so for 75 dollars.

=== School songs and chants ===
Several school songs are connected with the school's athletic heritage. The alma mater of Rutgers University is "On the Banks of the Old Raritan", with words written by Howard Fullerton (Rutgers Class of 1874) and adapted to the old Scottish melody "On the Banks of the Old Dundee." It is typically performed at the close of athletic events by the university's marching band, the Marching Scarlet Knights (also called "The Pride of New Jersey"), at Rutgers University Glee Club concerts, commencement and other important school events. The university's fight song, "The Bells Must Ring", is performed often during athletic events especially in recognition of notable scores. Written in 1931 for entry in a student song contest, pianist Richard M. Hadden (Rutgers Class of 1932) composed the song with W. E. Sanford (Rutgers Class of 1930). Between the verses of the fight song, the spirit chant is rhythmically shouted.

This chant is one of many recited during Rutgers athletic events. Another popular chant, where one side of the crowd yells out "R" and the other "U" antiphonally, is often performed. The original spirit chant used at Rutgers was "Rah! Rah! Rah! Bow-wow-wow! Rutgers!" However, it has not been performed in the modern era.

Other notable songs include "Nobody Ever Died for Dear Old Rutgers", composed by Jule Styne to lyrics by Sammy Cahn from the 1947 musical High Button Shoes. It parodies an 1892 game in which Frank "Pop" Grant, a Rutgers football player, was being taken from the field because of injuries and stated that he would "die for dear old Rutgers." Other sources state that the player said, "I will die if somebody does not give me a cigarette."

The song "Loyal Sons" exhorts Rutgers athletes (particularly football players) to "hit the line and run the ends boys... Score once more. Oh score once more."

=== Athletic rivalry ===
Rutgers maintains athletic rivalries with other collegiate institutions. The university has historic rivalries with Lafayette College, Lehigh University, Princeton University and Columbia University (formerly King's College) originating from the early days of college football. While they maintain the Princeton rivalry in other sports, neither of them have met in football since 1980. Rutgers has a men's basketball rivalry with Seton Hall University.

The university's longest active football rivalry is with Navy (dating back to 1891). This rivalry stems from Navy and Rutgers being two of the only three programs (the third is Army) to come out of the original, informal "Ivy League" that are still members of the top tier of NCAA college football (currently Division I FBS). Rutgers was a part of a round-robin conference known as the Middle Three Conference in football from 1929 through 1976, which included Lafayette and Lehigh. The winner of the annual round-robin received the Little Brass Cannon. The schools frequently met in other intercollegiate sports.

== Teams ==
Men's sports	Women's sports
Baseball	Basketball
Basketball	Cross country
Cross country	Field hockey
Football	Golf
Golf	Gymnastics
Lacrosse	Lacrosse
Soccer	Rowing
Track and field^{†}	Soccer
Wrestling	Softball
	Swimming & diving
	Tennis
	Track and field^{†}
	Volleyball
† – Track and field includes both indoor and outdoor.

=== Football ===
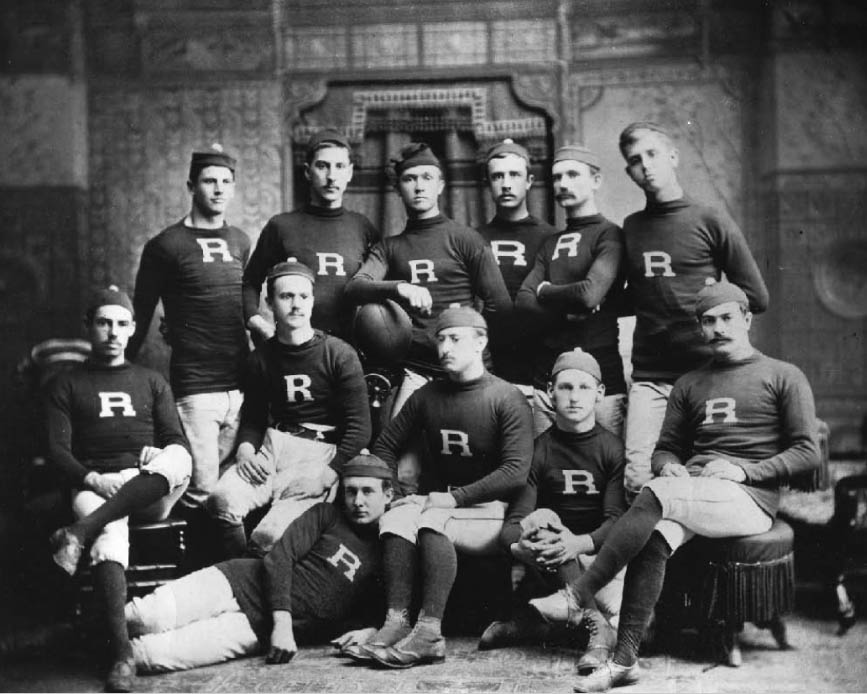
Rutgers team of 1882

Despite being the "birthplace of college football" and sharing the 1869 national championship with Princeton University in the first year of intercollegiate play, Rutgers has not had an overly successful heritage in the sport through the years. With 667 losses, Rutgers is among the losingest programs in the history of college football. Especially in the last three decades, Rutgers was regarded as one of the worst teams in what is now known as FBS (known as Division I-A before 2006), posting several losing seasons in a row and raising discussion of possibly reducing the team to I-AA/FCS competition.

For most of its existence, the football team was not associated with any formal football conference and remained independent even when the first football leagues were forming. At present, Rutgers participates in Division I FBS and joined the Big Ten Conference in 2014, after more than two decades in the original Big East Conference and one season in its football-sponsoring offshoot, the American Athletic Conference. The current coach is Greg Schiano, who replaced Chris Ash. Prior to Ash, the coach was Kyle Flood, who was let go from the program after a poor 2015 season. Flood had replaced Schiano who, after leading Rutgers to its first bowl games in decades, accepted the head coaching job for the Tampa Bay Buccaneers.

==== 2006 season ====
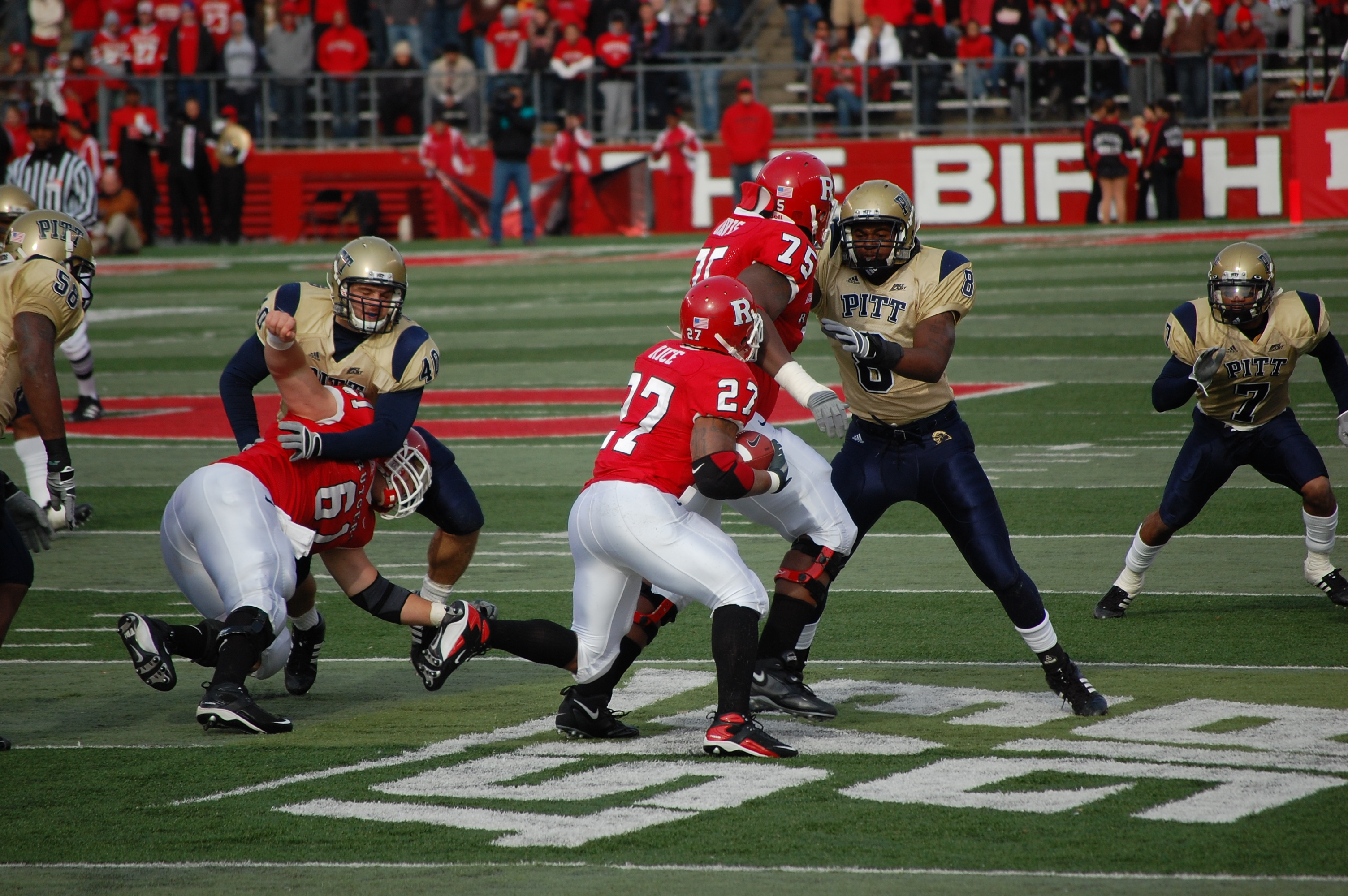
Rutgers' Scarlet Knights' running back Ray Rice follows his blockers in a game against the Pittsburgh Panthers on October 21, 2006.

In 2006, Rutgers boasted its best season in three decades, beginning its first nine games undefeated. Sports commentators and writers began referring to the 2006 season as Rutgers' "Cinderella season" as each week passed in victory, and Rutgers gained nationwide attention and raised discussion of a possible national championship appearance. Rutgers ascended the major college football polls from starting the season unranked to achieving its highest ranking ever after the Scarlet Knights' November 9 victory over the third-ranked, undefeated Louisville Cardinals. The 28–25 contest was won by kicker Jeremy Ito, who kicked the game-winning field goal at the end of the game. After the field goal was made, announcer Chris Carlan said his famous line: "It's pandemonium in Piscataway!" as excited fans stormed the field. "Piscataway" references the fact that the game was played in Piscataway, New Jersey, where Rutgers' Football Stadium is located. Rutgers fans still revel in the memory of the game, as it alleviated the stress of so many losing seasons, and marked the pinnacle of Rutgers football. Many fans consider it to be the best football game in Rutgers history. After this game, Rutgers jumped to seventh in the AP Poll, eighth in the USA Today/Coaches poll, seventh in the Harris Interactive Poll, and sixth in the Bowl Championship Series rankings. Finishing the regular season with a record of 10–2, with losses to the Cincinnati Bearcats and West Virginia Mountaineers. With a 37–10 victory over the Kansas State Wildcats in the inaugural Texas Bowl, Rutgers finished the 2006 season with a record of 11–2 and were ranked twelfth in the nation in the final Associated Press poll. This was Rutgers' highest final ranking ever in any national football poll, although they were ranked in the Top 25 of the Associated Press final poll previously in 1958, 1961 and 1976.

The 2006 team featured players such as Maxwell Award finalist, All-American halfback Ray Rice, quarterback Mike Teel, fullback Brian Leonard, tight end Clark Harris, wide receiver Tiquan Underwood, All-American defensive tackle Eric Foster, safety Courtney Greene, kicker Jeremy Ito, and punter Joe Radigan, who holds the longest-punt record (78 yards) in Rutgers history. Rice, who during the season broke several Rutgers football records, and with 1,794 rushing yards set the Big East's single-season record, came in seventh in voting for the 2006 Heisman Trophy. Head Coach Greg Schiano was awarded the 2006 Liberty Mutual Coach of the Year Award, the Home Depot Coach of the Year Award and the Eddie Robinson Coach of the Year award from the Football Writers Association of America.

=== Men's basketball ===
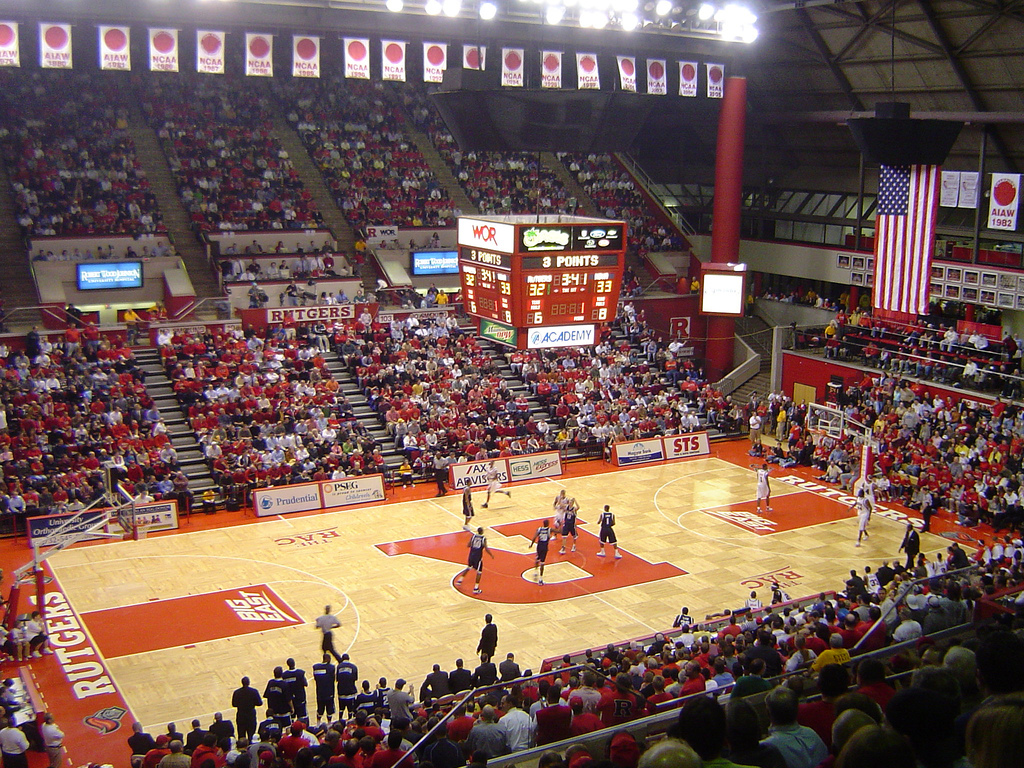
Interior of Jersey Mike's Arena during a game between Rutgers and Villanova, January 11, 2006; at the time, the arena was known as the Rutgers Athletic Center.

The Rutgers men's basketball team was among the "Final Four" in the 1976 Division I NCAA Tournament and ended the 1976 season ranked fourth in the nation, after an 86–70 loss against the Michigan Wolverines in the semifinal round and a 106–92 loss to the UCLA Bruins in the tournament's third-place consolation game. This was the last men's Division I tournament to date to feature two unbeaten teams, as both Indiana, who won that year's title, and Rutgers entered the tournament unbeaten. Rutgers went 31–0 during the regular season.

The Scarlet Knights also played in the 2004 NIT final, where they were defeated by the Michigan Wolverines. In 2005–2006, Quincy Douby set a Rutgers Basketball single season record by scoring 839 points. He left after his junior year to enter the NBA draft. Center Hamady N'Diaye, was taken by the Minnesota Timberwolves and traded to the Washington Wizards during the 2010 NBA draft. Ace Bailey and Dylan Harper became the highest ranked basketball recruits in Rutgers history in 2024, and the highest draft picks to make it to the NBA, being drafted 5th and 2nd overall in 2025. The Scarlet Knights' current coach is Steve Pikiell.

=== Women's basketball ===
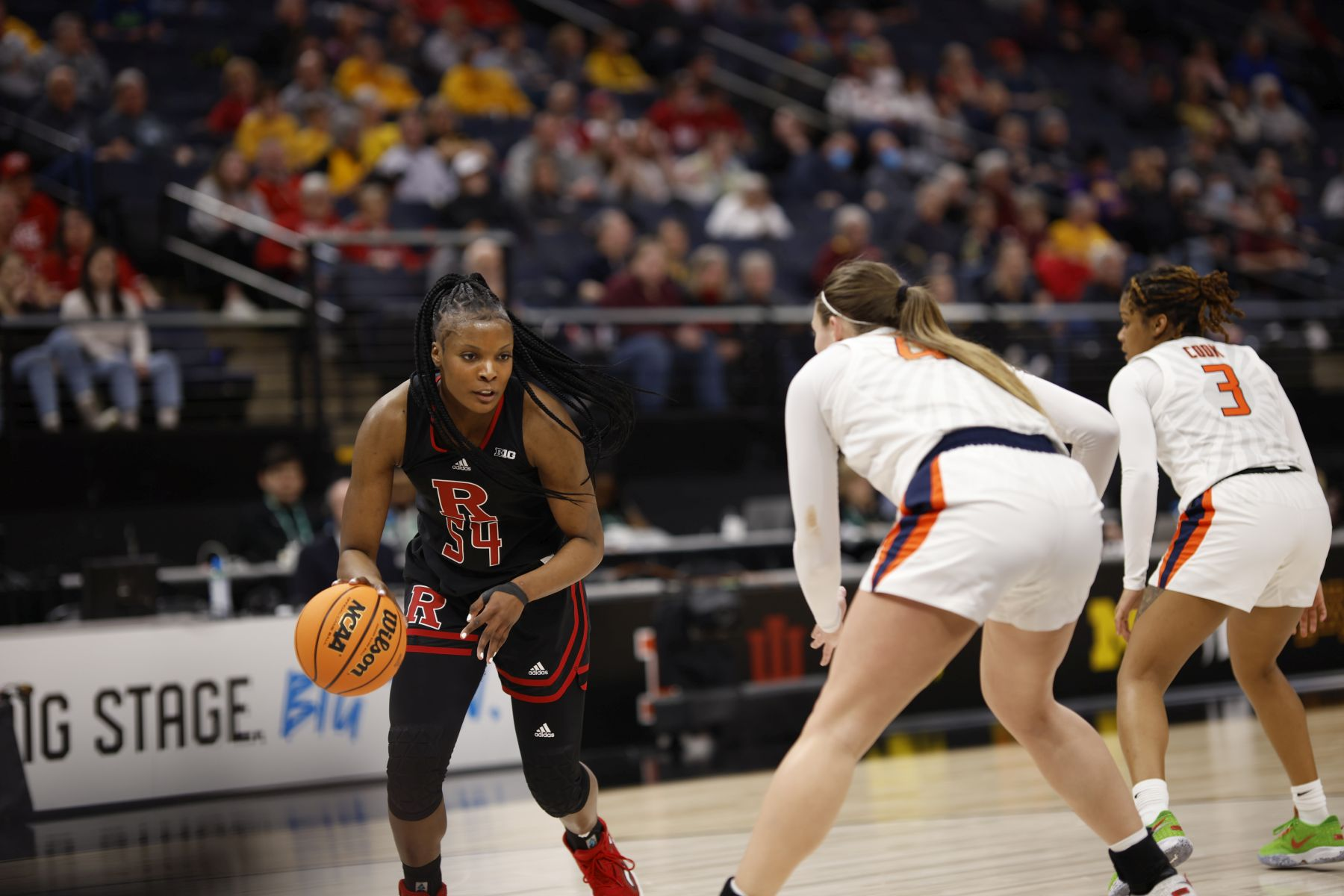
Rutgers (in black) v. Illinois game in 2023

The Scarlet Knights women's basketball has been one of the more successful programs in the school. In the 2005–2006 season, Rutgers at one point was ranked fourth in the nation, and reached the Elite Eight behind the shooting of Cappie Pondexter. In the 2006–07 season, Rutgers finished second in the regular season behind UConn, but went on to defeat the Huskies in the Big East Championship game.

Rutgers beat first-seeded Duke 53–52 in the 2007 NCAA Women's Division I Basketball Tournament, and advanced to the 2007 Women's Final Four. In the national semifinals, they defeated LSU, 59–35 and advanced to their first ever National Championship game. In that game, however, they lost to the Tennessee Lady Volunteers by a score of 59–46.

In June 2007, the Rutgers women's basketball team earned the Irv Grossman Award of Merit as providing service and unique achievement to increase appreciation for and elevate the status of women's collegiate sports on a national level. The award is named after Irv Grossman, the founder of the Honda Awards Program.

In 2007, the team also won the Wilma Rudolph Courage award. This is given annually to a female athlete or team who exhibits extraordinary courage in her athletic performance, demonstrates the ability to overcome adversity, makes significant contributions to sports and serves as an inspiration and role model to those who face challenges, overcomes them and strives for success at all levels.

The team is currently coached by Coquese Washington.

=== Field hockey ===
In 2021, the Scarlet Knights defeated the Michigan Wolverines by a score of 1–0 in the Big Ten tournament championship game. The Scarlet Knights became the first Rutgers program to ever win a Big Ten Tournament championship, and just the second RU program to earn any Big Ten Championship after the women's soccer program won the regular season title earlier in the same year.

=== Men's lacrosse ===
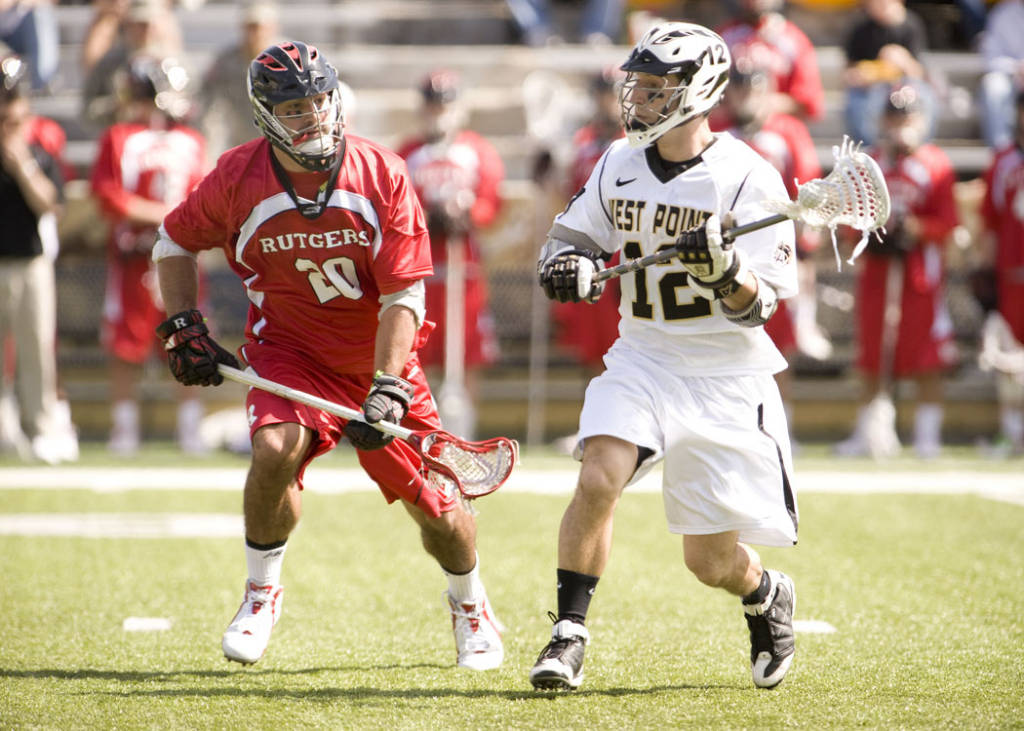
Rutgers v. Army lacrosse game in 2010

Rutgers began playing lacrosse in 1887. The team lasted three years, folding in 1889 after its 2–1 season. The program was re-instated in 1920 due in part to the efforts of Harland W. "Tots" Meistrell. In 1926, Fred Fitch took over the program and began a period of national prominence. The team joined the USILA and in 1928 was awarded one of the association's gold medals as an outstanding team, along with three other teams that also shared the championship (Johns Hopkins, Maryland, and Navy). In 1932, the Rutgers team, led by "the best attack pair in the country", George Latimer and Frenchy Julien, participated in the U.S. Olympic team tryouts.

Rutgers appeared in its first NCAA tournament in 1972. Since its inception in 1887, the Scarlet Knights have won 560 games and one national Class B championship, as well as producing 197 All-Americans and 10 lacrosse hall of famers.

=== Men's soccer ===
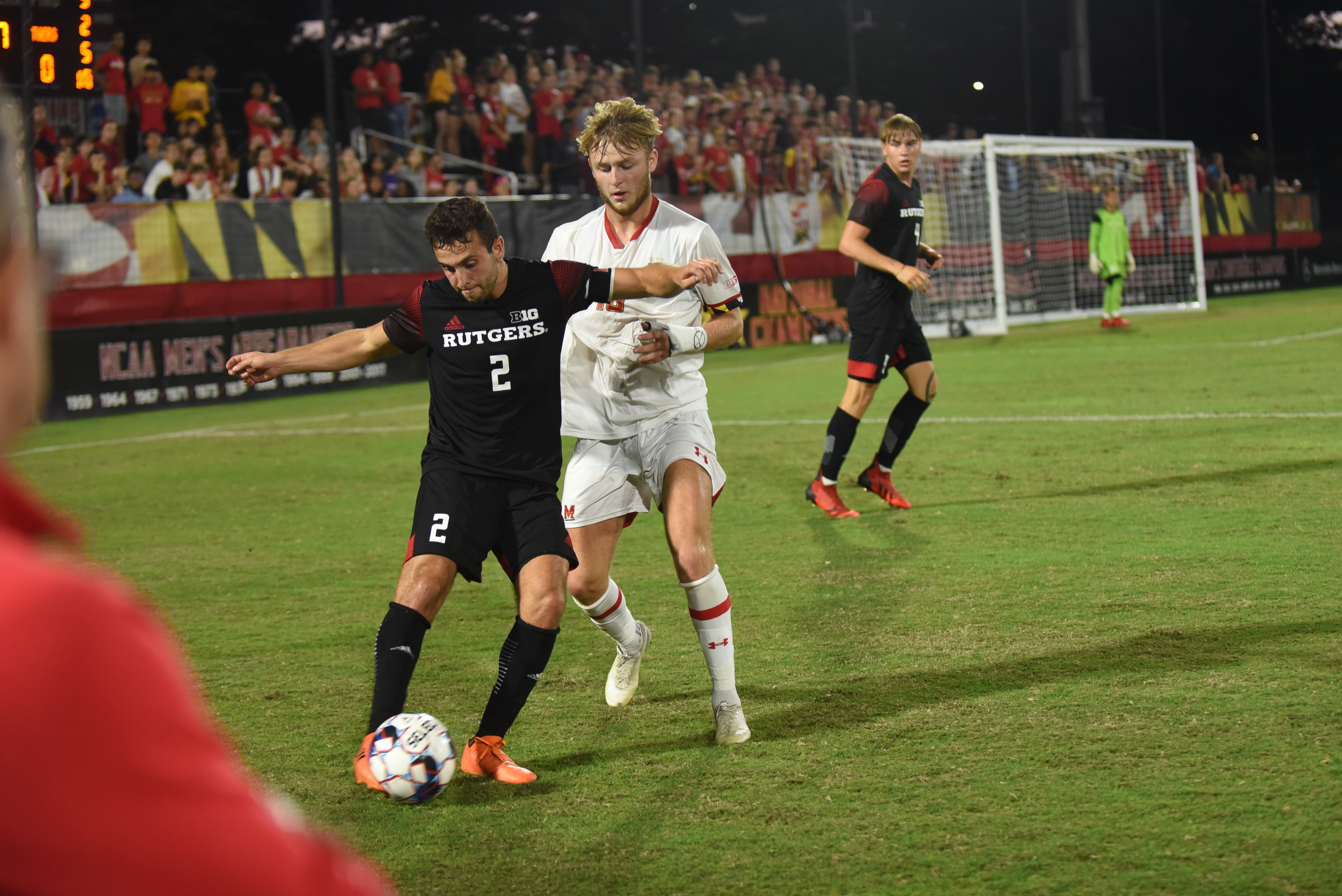
Rutgers (in black kit) v. Maryland match in 2021

The origins of Rutgers soccer trace back to 1869, where the first ever collegiate football game was played in the United States, with rules based on The Football Association. These two games versus Princeton are considered to be the first organized American college football games to ever be played.

Rutgers' first varsity team was fielded in 1938, where the Knights competed as an independent team. Rutgers remained unaffiliated with any formal athletic conference, and was considered an independent until joining the Atlantic 10 Conference as an associate soccer member in the mid-1980s.

=== Women's soccer ===
Founded in 1984, the Scarlet Knights women's soccer team has earned fourteen at-large bids to the NCAA Tournament (1987, 2001, 2003, 2006, 2008, 2009, 2012, 2013, 2015, 2016, 2017, 2018, 2021, 2022) and has won three Eastern Collegiate Athletic Conference championship titles (1990, 1991, 1992).

In 2021, the Scarlet Knights won the first Big Ten team title in school history, going undefeated against Big Ten teams during the regular season.

=== Softball ===
The Scarlet Knights softball team has appeared in two Women's College World Series, in 1979 and 1981.

=== Wrestling ===
On March 23, 2019, Nick Suriano and Anthony Ashnault became the first two NCAA national champions in Rutgers history.

== Notable non-varsity sports ==
=== Men's crew ===
The men's crew team became the first organized sport at Rutgers in 1864. It started as more of a social activity for students, but quickly after the Rutgers Boating Association was formed, the team began to race against other local teams on the Raritan River. In 1950, the Class of 1914 Boathouse was constructed along the Raritan River, complete with three bays, locker rooms, ergometer training room, and offices for the coaches. The current boathouse is located just off of Route 18 on Cook-Douglass Campus, and is used by both the men's crew and women's rowing teams.

The historic team built a strong crew program of heavyweight and lightweight men, producing several Olympic champions. At the end of the 2007 season, due to university-wide budget cuts, the team lost their varsity status and was reduced to "club" status. Since then, the team has continued to succeed against high-level competitors and goes on to compete in the annual ACRA Championship.

=== Ice hockey ===
Ice hockey has existed in some form at Rutgers dating back to 1892, following a game against a "picked team of Princeton men" on Westons Mill Pond. Currently, the school has two teams competing at different levels of the American Collegiate Hockey Association (ACHA). The Division 1 team competes in the Northeast Collegiate Hockey League (NECHL), and the Division 2 team in the Colonial States College Hockey Conference (CSCHC). In 1998, the university hosted the ACHA Division II National Championship, which was won by Life University.

=== Rugby ===
Founded in 1965, Rutgers Rugby Football Club plays Division 1 college rugby in the Empire Conference against local rivals such as Syracuse. For the 2010–11 and 2011–12 seasons, Rutgers played in the College Premier Division, where they were led by Evan Fitzgerald, who holds Rutgers career records in tries scored (32) and points scored (176). Rutgers finished the 2010–11 season ranked 24th in the nation. Rutgers rugby is active in spreading the sport throughout New Jersey through involvement in youth leagues and inter-state competitions. Rutgers rugby is led by head coaches Mark Dobbs and Omar Rivera.

=== Ultimate ===
The first intercollegiate competition in Ultimate Frisbee (now called simply "Ultimate") was held between students from Rutgers and Princeton on November 6, 1972, to mark the one hundred third anniversary of the first intercollegiate football game. Rutgers won 29–27.

The Rutgers Ultimate club continued to thrive, adopting the name Hot Animal Machine, which later became just Machine. They compete today in the Metro East division of USA Ultimate, the governing body of North American Ultimate.

=== Powerboating ===
In 1933 and 1934, Rutgers won the collegiate national championships in powerboating.

== Championships ==
=== NCAA team championships ===
Rutgers has won 1 NCAA national championship:

- Men's (1)
  - Fencing (1): 1949 (co-champions)
- See also:
  - List of NCAA schools with the most NCAA Division I championships
  - Big Ten Conference NCAA national team championships

=== Other national team championships ===
Below are 3 national team titles that were not bestowed by the NCAA:

- Women's (3):
  - Basketball (AIAW) (1): 1982
  - Cheerleading (2): 1998, 2009
- Men's (1):
  - Football (In FBS record book) (1): 1869 (co-champion with Princeton)
  - Men's fencing (1): 1949
- See also:
  - List of Big Ten Conference National Championships

=== Conference championships ===
- Men's conference champions:
  - Baseball, Big East Tournament champions (1998)
  - Baseball, Big East Tournament champions (2000)
  - Baseball, Big East Conference champions (2000)
  - Baseball, Big East Tournament champions (2007)
  - Basketball, Atlantic 10 Conference Tournament champions (1989)
  - Track & field, Outdoor Big East champions (2005)
  - Football, Big East Conference co-champions (2012)
  - Soccer, Big Ten Tournament champions (2022)
- Women's conference champions:
  - Basketball, Big East Tournament champions (2007)
  - Soccer, Big East Conference champions (1997)
  - Soccer, Big Ten Regular Season champions (2021)
  - Field hockey, Big Ten Tournament champions (2021)

=== Other championships ===
- Football postseason bowl victories:
  - Texas Bowl (2006)
  - International Bowl (2008)
  - Papa John's Bowl (2008)
  - St. Petersburg Bowl (2009)
  - New Era Pinstripe Bowl (2011)
  - Quick Lane Bowl (2014)
  - Bad Boy Mowers Pinstripe Bowl (2023)
- Other championships:
  - Men's track & field, Indoor IC4A Champions (2005)
  - Men's track & field, Outdoor IC4A Champions (2005)
  - Women's basketball, WNIT Champions (2014)

== Controversy and debate ==
=== Regarding "bigger time" athletics ===
Rutgers University's seventeenth president, Edward J. Bloustein (1925–1989), envisioned a drive for success at Rutgers that involved participation in "bigger-time" athletics. Several of the nation's colleges became associated with Division I-AA (now FCS) when that designation was established in the late 1970s, including many of Rutgers' historic rivals like Princeton, Columbia, Lehigh and Lafayette College. Bloustein decided that Rutgers ought to pursue developments that would place the university on par with comparable state universities, both academically and athletically. This led to Rutgers opting for inclusion among Division I, and later, under president Francis L. Lawrence, joining the Big East Conference in 1991.

William C. Dowling, a university professor in the Department of English, and other like-minded faculty, students, and alumni, organized a movement known as "Rutgers 1000" in 1993, working to return Rutgers to its older tradition of participatory athletics by joining such institutions as the University of Chicago and NYU in the NCAA's Div III. Though the group dissolved itself in 2003 under the mistaken impression that President Richard McCormick supported its position, it was revived in 2007 when McCormick and the Board of Governors announced a $102 million expansion of the football stadium. Also in 2007, Professor Dowling came under fire from athletic director Bob Mulcahy, regarding remarks Mulcahy perceived as being insulting to minority athletes. In 2011, Dowling received the Drake Group's Robert Maynard Hutchins Award for his opposition to the degradation of academic and intellectual values at Rutgers by commercialized Div IA athletics.

Rutgers efforts to upgrade the quality of its football program have raised criticism by many alumni, faculty and students regarding the size of athletic department's budget, wishing to divert its funds elsewhere. The athletic department's budget is $35.5 million, compared to a $1.6 billion budget for the entire university. Most of the athletics budget comes from self-generating revenue (ticket sales, merchandise, broadcast rights), while the rest is taken from mandatory student fees. Though widely dismissed by Rutgers 1000 supporters as a logical fallacy, the argument that having a very visible football program increases the donations to the athletic department and even the university as a whole is made by some Scarlet R supporters. An increase in enrollment applications of 12% upon joining the Big Ten Conference, and applicants who score 20 points higher on the SAT, would tend to bear that out.

Though some critics feared that the focus on FBS athletics would lower admissions and academic standards, the Rutgers football team set a record high for Academic Performance Rate (APR) of any Football Bowl Sub-division team with a score of 992 in 2010.

A final complaint was that the upgraded football schedule would prevent competing against long standing rivals Princeton, Columbia, Lehigh, and Lafayette. However, supporters of the move claim it would make Rutgers more comparable to large, prestigious state universities such as the University of Michigan and University of California, and private institutions such as Stanford University, which have been touted for balancing their academic reputation with athletic success.

=== Budget cuts and financial woes ===
In the writing of New Jersey's 2006 state budget, the state legislature cut $66 million from the government's appropriations to Rutgers. The university responded by reducing several classes, laying off staff and junior faculty, and closing several programs. The athletic department announced that it would be ending six athletic programs beginning in the 2007–2008 academic year. These athletic programs affected are the men's lightweight and heavyweight crew (see list of Rutgers crew Olympic and national team members below; prior to the cuts, Rutgers crew produced at least 15 Olympians and mational men's team members), the men's swimming and diving team, men's tennis teams, and men's and women's fencing. Title IX concerns also played a significant role in these cuts.

Since joining the Big Ten conference in 2014, Rutgers racked up $265 million in debt by 2021, leading Phil Murphy, the governor of New Jersey, to describe the financial situation as "quite concerning". In March 2022, Rutgers president Jonathan Holloway admitted that the athletic department was "highly unlikely" to break even despite Big 10 revenue and increased investments.

== Venues ==
=== New Brunswick/Piscataway ===
Rutgers University fields 27 sports teams from their New Brunswick Campus for NCAA Division I competition, with the football team playing in the top-level FBS subdivision. Most of the university's 14 athletic venues and facilities are currently located in Piscataway on the Busch and Livingston campuses, with two facilities in New Brunswick (the College Avenue Gymnasium and the Class of 1914 Boathouse). Though the College Avenue Gymnasium has hosted a large variety of athletic events—including memorable games in the 1976 NCAA Men's Division I Basketball Tournament in which Rutgers advanced to the "Final Four", subsequently ending the season fourth in the nation—it was also the site of conventions to revise the New Jersey State Constitution in 1947 and 1966.

One hundred and twenty-five years after Rutgers and Princeton inaugurated the tradition of American football, High Point Solutions Stadium, which opened as a 42,000-seat facility but has since been expanded to 52,454 capacity seating, was opened during the 1994 football season. The field at High Point Solutions Stadium is large enough to host national and international soccer matches. Jersey Mike's Arena, formerly known as the Rutgers Athletic Center, is home to the Rutgers men's and women's basketball programs, and has a capacity of 8,000 seats.

The soccer teams play at Yurcak Field, which accommodates over 5,000 fans. The lacrosse teams played there from 1994 until 2013 before moving to the High Point Solutions Stadium in 2014. Built in 1994, Yurcak Field, recognized as one of the premiere collegiate venues for these two sports in the United States, was named in honor of Rutgers alumnus Ronald N. Yurcak, a 1965 All-American Lacrosse player. Rutgers also operates an 18-hole 6,337-yard, par 71 golf course, designed by Hal Purdy and awarded four stars in 2004 by Golf Magazine and ranked by Golf Digest as "Best Place to Play".

== Notable athletes ==
A growing number of alumni who participated in athletic programs during their undergraduate years at Rutgers University have continued their athletic careers professionally. A few have become coaches, managers, or owners of professional teams, including Alexi Lalas, Class of 1991, a former U.S. Soccer National Team member and former president and general manager of the Los Angeles Galaxy; Eddie Jordan, Class of 1977, head coach of the Philadelphia 76ers; Sonny Werblin, Class of 1932, founder of the New York Jets in the National Football League; and Jeff Torborg, Class of 1963, a Major League Baseball catcher with the Los Angeles Dodgers and California Angels who went on to manage several teams in Major League Baseball. Alumni also include coaches of college athletic teams, including Jim Valvano, Class of 1967, who, while coach at North Carolina State University, won 1983 NCAA Men's Division I Basketball Tournament. David Stern, Class of 1963, was the commissioner of the National Basketball Association (NBA) until 2014.

Jon Conway, Class of 1999, is currently a goalkeeper for the Los Angeles Galaxy. Josh Gros, Class of 2003, was a midfielder for D.C. United in Major League Soccer. Carli Lloyd, former women's soccer star, played on the United States women's national soccer team in the 2007, 2011, and 2015 World Cups, plus the 2008 and 2012 Olympics. Lloyd is notable for scoring three goals on the way to a gold medal in the 2015 FIFA Women's World Cup Final vs Japan. Todd Frazier was the 2015 MLB Homrun Derby Champion with the Cincinnati Reds.

Players who went on to the National Football League include Deron Cherry, Class of 1980 (Kansas City Chiefs and member of the NFL 1980s All-Decade Team); quarterback Ray Lucas, class of 1996 (New York Jets, Miami Dolphins 1996–2002), Quarterback Mike McMahon, Class of 2001 (Minnesota Vikings); center Shaun O'Hara, Class of 2000 (New York Giants); tight end L. J. Smith, Class of 2003 (Baltimore Ravens); middle linebacker Gary Brackett, Class of 2002 (Indianapolis Colts); tight end Marco Battaglia, Class of 1996 (Pittsburgh Steelers); Brian Leonard (Class of 2007, drafted by the St. Louis Rams in the 2nd round of the 2007 NFL draft); Kenny Britt (Class of 2010, drafted by the Tennessee Titans in the 1st round of the 2009 NFL draft) ; Heisman Trophy candidate Ray Rice (Class of 2009, drafted by the Baltimore Ravens in the 2008 NFL draft); and offensive guard Darnell Stapleton, who started for the Super Bowl Champion Pittsburgh Steelers during the championship game.

David DeJesus is currently a center fielder for the Chicago Cubs.

Rutgers' women's basketball program has sent several women to the Women's National Basketball Association (WNBA), including Sue Wicks, Class of 1988, who played for the New York Liberty from 1997 to 2002, and was a member of the American team in the 1988 Summer Olympics in Seoul, Korea; and most recently Cappie Pondexter, Class of 2006, of the Phoenix Mercury; and Tammy Sutton-Brown, Class of 2001, with the Charlotte Sting. In Rutgers men's basketball, Roy Hinson, class of 1982, was a long-time player in the league, and Quincy Douby was drafted in 2006 as a guard for the Sacramento Kings. Ace Bailey and Dylan Harper were the highest NBA draft picks from Rutgers, being drafted 5ht overall and 2nd overall in 2025 NBA draft.

Rutgers rowing has produced an exceptional number of Olympians and national team members who have won Olympic medals and World Championships. Tom Price and Charlie Logg won gold in the 1952 Summer Olympics. In total, Rutgers rowing alumni have won at least 15 Olympic and World Championship titles, and numerous other Olympic and World Championship silver and bronze medals.

Other Rutgers rowing Olympians and national team members include:

- Fred Borchelt 1984 Summer Olympics silver medal, Olympian in 1976, 1980 and 1984
- Max Borghard, two-time US National Team member; current women's head coach at Rutgers University
- Charley Butt, World Championship silver medalist; cerrent men's head coach at Harvard University
- Steven Christensen, 1976 and 1980 Olympian (transferred to University of Pennsylvania during undergraduate career)
- David Collins, bronze medalist in Rowing at the 1996 Summer Olympics
- Ned Delguercio, World Champion in 2007 and 2008
- Jennifer Dore, 1996 and 2000 Olympian; World Champion in 1995
- Sean Hall, 1992, 1996 and 2000 Olympian; World Champion in 1994
- Robert Kaehler, 1992, 1996 and 2000 Olympian; World Champion in 1994, 1997, 1998 and 1999
- Jeffrey Klepacki, 1992, 1996 and 2000 Olympian; World Champion in 1994, 1998 and 1999
- Sharon Kriz
- Fran McGovern
- James Neil, 1992 and 1996 Olympian; World Champion 1999
- Grant Nichols
- William Porter, World Championship bronze medalist; current women's head coach at Yale University
- Sam Stitt, 2008 Olympian; World Championship silver and bronze medalist
- Maite Urtasun, 2002 World Champion

Notable head rowing coaches who are Rutgers alumni:

- Charley Butt, men's head coach at Harvard University; coached the Harvard men's lightweight team to numerous championships over 28 years prior to being named heavyweight coach in 2013
- Rob Friedrich, men's head coach at the United States Naval Academy
- Sean Hall, head coach since 2015 at the storied Penn Athletic Club Rowing Association
- William Porter, women's head coach at Yale University; his team has won the NCAA Championship
- Andy Teitelbaum, women's head coach at Ohio State University; has won three consecutive NCAA Division I Rowing Championship: 2013, 2014, 2015
- Tom Terhaar, head coach of USA Women's Olympic and national team; under his leadership, the US women's 8+ has won 10 consecutive world titles, including Olympic gold in 2008 and 2012

The Super Bowl winners from 2007 to 2009 each had a Rutgers undrafted free agent start for them:

- Super Bowl XLI – Gary Brackett – middle linebacker – Indianapolis Colts
- Super Bowl XLII – Shaun O'Hara – center – New York Giants
- Super Bowl XLIII – Darnell Stapleton – offensive guard – Pittsburgh Steelers

== Notable athletics coaches ==
See List of Rutgers University people#Athletic coaches

== Rutgers–Newark ==
Rutgers–Newark fields teams for NCAA Division III competition in men's and women's soccer, basketball, tennis, and volleyball, as well as baseball for men and softball for women. The men's volleyball team competed as a Division I member through the 2014 season (2013–14 school year), but completed a transition to Division III after that season. Their teams are known as the "Scarlet Raiders." Built in 1977, the Golden Dome Athletic Center is the hub of Rutgers–Newark athletics, seating 2,000. Soccer and softball games are held on Alumni Field, while the Rutgers–Newark baseball team plays at Bears & Eagles Riverfront Stadium, a 6,200-seat ballpark that is home to the Newark Bears, a minor-league professional baseball franchise.

== Rutgers–Camden ==
Rutgers–Camden fields teams for NCAA Division III competition in Men's and Women's Crew, Cross Country, Golf, Soccer, Volleyball, Basketball, Indoor Track, Baseball (men), Softball (women), and Track and Field. Their teams are known as the "Scarlet Raptors." In 2006, Rutgers–Camden won the NCAA Division III Softball championship, defeating two-time defending champion St. Thomas, 3–2 to capture the school's first national title. Rutgers–Camden basketball also holds the unfortunate distinction of the longest losing streak in college basketball, set in 1997. The team was disbanded, but student outcry led to a re-instatement. Rutgers–Camden broke its NCAA-record 117-game losing streak with a 77–72 victory over Bloomfield College.

== RVision ==
A part of the Rutgers University Department of Athletic Communications, RVision, is a digital media network that is responsible for providing live and highlight video coverage of many Rutgers intercollegiate athletic events. Created in 2009, RVision broadcasts more than 100 live events in addition to countless interviews and game highlights posted by the RVision staff on ScarletKnights.com. With the recent addition of Rutgers to the Big Ten Conference in 2014, RVision set up a fundraiser nicknamed RStarter. RStarter's goal was to raise $30,000 to improve all aspects of RVision and bring even better coverage of all sports to Rutgers fans. RStarter's proceeds would go toward the purchase of new cameras, laptops and student stipends. By the start of the opening day for football on August 28, 2014, fans and supporters came together and raised over $32,000 for the RVision Network.

With the addition of the university to the Big Ten Conference comes the addition of a national television outlet, the Big Ten Network (BTN). RVision and BTN work hand in hand to bring sports fanatics as much coverage as possible of Rutgers athletics. "There is an additional amount of work that BTN needs for their network that we can now shoot for them since we're here and local," said Rutgers senior associate athletics director Jason Baum, who has overseen the venture since its launch in 2009. "RVision is a three-person team led by Colin Osborne that has a lot on their plate. I don't know if there are too many people that work as many hours a year as the RVision crew." RVision has been asked by the Big Ten Network to provide footage of games, individual players, talkbacks with players and coaches, and scenic shots around campus with a Big Ten-logoed sign.

RVision continues to expand its broadcasts and its student crews. On any given day RVision can have several crews shooting multiple different athletic events all across the Rutgers–New Brunswick Campus.

== Notes and references ==
=== Books and printed materials ===
- Demarest, William Henry Steele. History of Rutgers College: 1776–1924. (New Brunswick, New Jersey: Rutgers College, 1924). (no ISBN)
- Dowling, William C. Confessions of a Spoilsport: My Life and Hard Times Fighting Sports Corruption at an Old Eastern University. (Penn State University Press, 2007). ISBN 978-0-271-03293-1.
- Leitch, A Princeton Companion (Princeton, New Jersey: Princeton University Press, 1978).
- Lukac, George J. (ed.), Aloud to Alma Mater. (New Brunswick, New Jersey: Rutgers University Press, 1966), 70–73. (no ISBN)
- McCormick, Richard P. Rutgers: a Bicentennial History. (New Brunswick, New Jersey: Rutgers University Press, 1966). ISBN 0-8135-0521-6
- Schmidt, George P. Princeton and Rutgers: The Two Colonial Colleges of New Jersey. (Princeton, New Jersey: Van Nostrand, 1964). (no ISBN)

=== Online resources ===
- Division I-A Historical Scores Index by James Howell
