= Rutgers School of Environmental and Biological Sciences =

Constituent school within Rutgers

Coordinates: 40.48327°N 74.43728°W

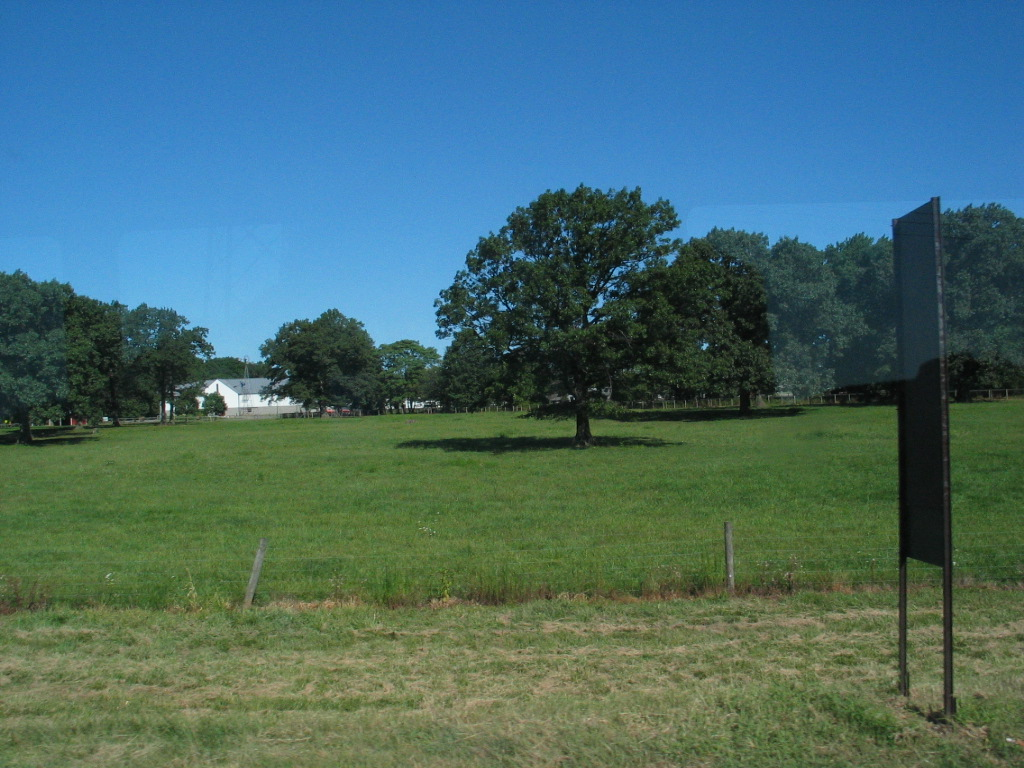
One of the school's fields

The School of Environmental and Biological Sciences (SEBS) is a constituent school of Rutgers University's New Brunswick-Piscataway campus. Formerly known as Cook College—which was named for George Hammell Cook, a professor at Rutgers in the 19th Century—it was founded as the Rutgers Scientific School and later College of Agriculture after Rutgers was named New Jersey's land-grant college under the Morrill Act of 1862. Today, unlike the other arts and sciences schools at Rutgers, the School of Environmental and Biological Sciences specializes in environmental science, animal science and other life sciences. Although physically attached to the New Brunswick-Piscataway campus, most of the SEBS campus lies in North Brunswick, New Jersey.

The School of Environmental and Biological Sciences is also home to the New Jersey Agriculture Experiment Station and the Rutgers Gardens, a 50-acre (200,000 m^{2}) botanical garden.

Cook campus is crossed by the Westons Mill Pond section of the scenic Lawrence Brook, which flows along Rutgers vegetable research farm, Rutgers equine research farm, Rutgers Gardens and Rutgers Helyar's woods.

A continuing professional education unit that provides professional education and training for environmental related program areas sits on the edge of Cook Campus and is part of the New Jersey Agricultural Experiment Station. New Jersey Agricultural Experiment Station Office of Continuing Professional Education.

== History ==
Originally called New Jersey College of Agriculture, the name was changed in 1965 to the College of Agriculture and Environmental Sciences and was again changed in 1975 to Cook College. It was also at this time that Cook College became residential with the building of the Newell Apartments. In 2007 it was again renamed as the School of Environmental and Biological Sciences as part of a larger reorganization of the university.

Martin Hall on Cook Campus was the location of Nobel Prize winner Selman Waksman's research in soil microbes. It was here that Waksman and his colleagues are credited with isolating several antibiotics most notably streptomycin which was used successfully against diseases such as tuberculosis.

== Academics ==
=== Programs ===
- Agriculture and Food Systems
- Animal Science
- Biochemistry
- Biological Sciences
- Biotechnology
- Ecology, Evolution, and Natural Resources
- Entomology
- Environmental and Business Economics
- Environmental Planning
- Environmental Policy, Institutions and Behavior
- Environmental Sciences
- Exercise Science and Sports Studies
- Food Science
- Landscape Architecture
- Marine Science
- Meteorology
- Microbiology
- Nutritional Sciences
- Plant Science
- Public Health

== Campus and student life ==
=== Residence halls on the G. H. Cook Campus ===
- Perry Hall (Freshman Residence Hall)
- Voorhees Hall (Freshman Residence Hall)
- Nicholas Hall (Freshman Residence Hall)
- Newell Apts. (On-campus apartments for non-freshmen)
- Starkey Apts. (On-campus apartments for non-freshmen)
- Helyar House (Cooperative Living)

=== SEBS Governing Council ===
The SEBS Governing Council (SGC) currently serves as the student government for the School of Environmental and Biological Sciences. The council is composed of student representatives from every major, a number proportionate to the number of students in that major, as well as Class Representatives, University Senators and RUSA Representatives.

The council was established as the Cook College Council (CCC) in 1974, and was later renamed the SEBS-Cook Council (SCC) in 2006 with the renaming of the school. Beginning with 2010-2011 academic year, Rutgers University merged all the student councils into an elected Rutgers University Student Assembly (RUSA), but the professional schools remained separate councils. The SEBS Governing Council fulfills this role.

=== Recreation Activities Crew ===
The Recreation Activities Crew (formerly known as Recreation Advisory Council and known as RAC on the Cook Campus) is an organization that is composed of student volunteers and meets weekly. The mission of this group is to get students involved with community events both within Rutgers University and with the city of New Brunswick. They have put together events like Special Friends Day, Price is right, Deal or No Deal, Trivia Bowl and other small events. Special Friends Day is one of the biggest community events that the Recreation Advisory Council hosts. Volunteers set up the Cook/Douglass Recreation Center into a themed place. Their parents get a day off from taking care of them and allows them to spend some alone time. Also the students that volunteer get a unique and special experience that will last a lifetime. Each year, the theme is different. The most recent theme (March, 2009) was Board Games. Each year, hundreds of hours of student time are poured into creating this one special day. The Special Friends Day past themes include—2008: Disney: 2007; Heroes.

== Agricultural Field Day ==
Rutgers Agricultural Field Day is a farm-oriented event held at Rutgers University's Cook Campus in New Brunswick, New Jersey, United States, on the last Saturday of April. The event includes 4-H animal fairs, farm tours, plant sales, and department-specific exhibits such as the entomology department's cockroach races. The first Field Day was held in August 1906 at the College Farm, and since 2009 the event has been held as part of Rutgers Day. It—and the New Jersey Folk Festival on the adjoining Douglass campus—still attract over 10,000 people annually.

Started in 1906, "Ag Field Day" began as a way for farmers to learn about the NJ Agricultural Experiment Station's studies. It expanded to lectures, demonstrations and tours in 1917, and was later embraced by students as a party focal-point. By the mid-90s, university administration scaled back the evening party atmosphere to decrease attendance by non-students and curb underage drinking. The event's daytime activities continue unabated, and are open to all.

Since 2009, Ag Field Day has been coincident with the university-wide Rutgers Day.

== See also ==
- Colonial colleges
- List of Rutgers University people
- Rutgers Gardens
- Rutgers–Camden
- Rutgers–Newark
- Lawrence Brook
- Jacob Goodale Lipman
