= Rutgers University Marching Scarlet Knights =

College marching band in New Brunswick, New Jersey

Marching Scarlet Knights
- School: Rutgers University
- Location: Piscataway, New Jersey
- Conference: Big Ten
- Founded: 1915
- Director: Todd Nichols
- Members: 375
- Fight song: "The Bells Must Ring” and “Colonel Rutgers"

Uniform
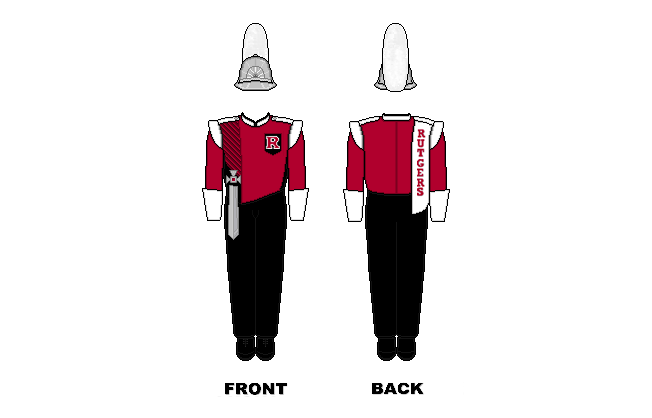
- Website: Website

The Marching Scarlet Knights (also known as The Pride of New Jersey) is the marching band of Rutgers University. The band was founded in 1915 as a small military band, and since then has grown into a 375-member athletic band for the university. The Marching Scarlet Knights performs at all home Rutgers Scarlet Knights football games. The band also travels to select regular season and post season football games.

== History ==
The Marching Scarlet Knights band began in 1915 as an 11-member military band, playing for the Rutgers College Cadet Corps as part of the R.O.T.C. program. The band played at a football game for the first time in 1921, and began marching on the field in 1928 By 1924, the band had separated from the R.O.T.C. program and began playing at home basketball games. However, instructors and funding for the marching band still originated in the military.

The band struggled to retain members throughout World War II. As a part of the military, band members and directors were often called into active duty. Around 1948, the band shifted from traditional military uniforms and style to a more casual “Ivy League” style, in which members wore straw hats, crimson sport coats, black ties, black slacks, and white shoes.

Under the direction of Casomir Bork during the 1960s, the band began having a band camp prior to the marching season. During the same time period, the band also began transitioning from the Ivy League style back to a more traditional style, modeled from the Michigan Marching Band. In 1966, Scott Whitener became the first full-time director of the Marching Scarlet Knights.

In 1968, the band officially changed from a military band to an athletic band. While football games were the main focus, the marching band also served as a pep band for home basketball games. Soon after the band's transition, Rutgers University began offering course credit for marching band. At the time, the Marching Scarlet Knights band was known as the “Rutgers Marching One Hundred.”

When Rutgers University began admitting women to the school in 1972, women were also allowed to join the Marching Scarlet Knights. Disputes among students arose while integrating women into the marching band, and internal problems led to the disbanding of the local chapter of the band fraternity Kappa Kappa Psi.

In the 1980s, William Berz changed the style of the band once again. He gradually transitioned the band from marching with high knees to a more modern glide step, in which band members keep straight legs, with their feet staying close to the ground.

The 1990s marked a time of constant change for the band. Six different directors led the band throughout the decade. Marching band enrollment decreased significantly during this time period. Then, in 2001, Rutgers University hired Timothy Smith as the band's director. As a combined result of a lasting band director and the Rutgers football team's newfound success, band enrollment began to increase again. In July 2017, Todd Nichols took over from Smith as the director of the Marching Scarlet Knights.

== Personnel ==
The Marching Scarlet Knights has eleven instrumental sections; Piccolos, clarinets, alto saxophones, tenor saxophones, trumpets, mellophones, trombones, baritones, sousaphones, a front ensemble, and a drum line. The front ensemble was added in 2018 and includes keyboard percussion, synthesizers, drum set, electric guitar, bass guitar, and non-pitched percussion. The band also features a color guard as well as multiple twirlers and a field major.

=== Drum Majors and Field Major ===
Unlike in many Big Ten marching bands, the position of drum major is separated from the role of field major. The field major is a performance oriented role that includes leading the band in parade block as well as performing a choreographed routine during the pregame show. This performance includes mace work as well as the traditional collegiate back bend. The current field major of the band is Paige DeGiovanni.

The position of drum major is the highest available leadership role in the Marching Scarlet Knights. The drum majors are responsible for conducting the band during rehearsal and performances, as well as heavily contributing to the day-to-day operations of the band including equipment, treasury, and general organization of student leadership. The current drum majors of the band are Devin B. Davis, Ethan Del Valle, Brittany Duarte, and Isabelle Mailman.

=== The Scarlet Girl ===
The "Scarlet Girl" is the featured baton twirler of the Marching Scarlet Knights. Like the field major, the Scarlet Girl performs a choreographed routine during the traditional pregame show. The current Scarlet Girl is Cameron Houck. Past Scarlet Girls include: Gianna Viola and Jordan Dezeeuw-Yager.

=== Past directors ===
- Leigh Kimball
- Charles W. Cook (1927-1939)
- Warrant Officer Vernon W. Miller (1939-1941)
- Wilbert Hitchner
- A.M. Bernyk
- Martin Sherman (1948-1955)
- Richard Gerstenberger (1955-1965)
- Casomir Bork (1962-1966)
- Scott Whitener (1966-1978)
- Raymond Lucia (1979)
- William L. Berz (1980-1988)
- John T. Madden (1988-1989)
- Jonathan Korzun (1989-1990)
- John Hendricks III (1990-1993)
- Timothy Gunter (1993-1995)
- Joe Brashier (1995-1998)
- Bill Kellerman (1999-2001)
- Timothy Smith (2001–2017)
- Todd Nichols (2017–present)

== Traditions ==
=== Band camp ===
One week before the fall semester of classes begins, the Marching Scarlet Knights band travels off campus for band camp. In recent years, the band has traveled to Lake Greeley Camp in Greeley, PA. During this camp, the band works from 8 in the morning until 9 at night to learn fight songs, stands tunes, and the first marching show of the season. During band camp, auditions determine part placement for band members.

=== Game day rehearsal ===
On home football game day, the band rehearses four hours before kickoff. Before setting up in parade block prior to the march into the stadium, the band gathers on the practice field to sing the university's alma mater. Members' hats are expected to be taken off whenever singing the alma mater.

=== Scarlet Walk ===
Two hours before kickoff at Rutgers home football games, the Marching Scarlet Knights band plays at “The First Game” statue while the football team walks by.

=== Postgame ===
After every home football game, the Marching Scarlet Knights performs "Loyal Sons" for the band's alumni.

== Notable performances ==
The Marching Scarlet Knights performed at Super Bowl XLVIII on February 2, 2014, during the pregame festivities. They put on a New York/ New Jersey themed show with the Syracuse University Marching Band. The song selections included Born in the U.S.A. and Born to Run by Bruce Springsteen, Livin' on a Prayer by Bon Jovi, New York, New York by Frank Sinatra, and Empire State of Mind by Jay-Z. In November 2023, the band made its first appearance in the Macy's Thanksgiving Day Parade. In September 2025, the band travelled to Metlife Stadium to perform their Halftime show at the New York Jets vs. Buffalo Bills game.
