= New Jersey Folk Festival =

Annual folk music and cultural festival

Coordinates: 40.48239°N 74.43349°W

- Date: NEW DATE: August 23, 2025
- Begins: 10 am
- Ends: 4 pm
- Frequency: Annual
- Locations: 2025: Davidson's Mill Pond Park; Previously: Eagleton Institute of Politics (the Great Lawn)
- Inaugurated: 1975
- Most recent: Our festival in April of 2025 was postponed due to weather concerns, we will now be hosting the festival August 23rd 2025 (rain date August 24th)
- Participants: Folk musicians, folk dancers, food vendors, craft vendors
- Website: njfolkfest.org

The New Jersey Folk Festival (NJFF) is an annual folk music and cultural festival held during Rutgers Day at Rutgers University, New Brunswick, New Jersey.

The 50th New Jersey Folk Festival was held on August 23, 2025, at Davidson's Mill Pond Park in North Brunswick, New Jersey after the original event in April was postponed due to weather concerns. The festival celebrated its 50th anniversary and selected the Garden State's history, music, traditions, and culture.

The 51st annual New Jersey Folk Festival was held on August 29, 2026, at Davidson's Mill Pond Park as well. The event included four stages of music and dance performances, along with folklife and gardening demonstrations, artisans, food vendors, and children's activities.

The theme of the 2025 NJFF was: "50th Anniversary—Celebrating New Jersey."

== Background ==
The NJFF is a free, non-profit, family event held every year on the last Saturday in April from 10 am to 4 pm, rain or shine. It coincides with Rutgers Agricultural Field Day, held on the adjacent Cook Campus as part of Rutgers Day. Traditionally held on the Great Lawn at the Wood Lawn mansion, home to the Eagleton Institute of Politics, in 2024 it moved to the lawn in the vicinity of the Passion Puddle.

Established in 1975, the New Jersey Folk Festival is the oldest continuously run folk festival in the State of New Jersey and believed to be one of the oldest festivals of its type in the United States. The festival attracts over 10,000 people and is one of the City of New Brunswick's largest regularly scheduled events. The NJFF is also one of the largest, outdoor annual cultural events in the state of New Jersey.

Typically, the event features stages and tents of music, dance, and workshops, a children's activities area,food choices, a folk marketplace, and a heritage area which offers a close-up look at each year's cultural or geographical theme or other appropriate exhibits.

The 2025 festival is being organized and sponsored by the executive board of the New Jersey Folk Festival Inc., in a partnership with the Rutgers University Collaborative Center for Community Engagement, led by Brian Patrick Kurisky. The New Jersey Folk Festival Inc. is a 501(c)(3) non-profit organization in the State of New Jersey exempt from federal taxation.

== History and mission ==
The mission of the New Jersey Folk Festival is to preserve and protect the music, culture, and arts of New Jersey. Therefore, the main focus of this festival is the traditional music, crafts, and foods of the diverse ethnic and cultural communities within the state and its surrounding region.

Each year the festival strives for diversity in selecting performers, not only seeking out traditional "American" artists, but also reaching out via fieldwork to the many ethnic communities found within New Jersey. The annual ethnic or regional feature contributes an essential intimate connection to these varied cultural groups represented in the state's population.

The New Jersey Folk Festival is professionally supervised by Maria Kennedy and co-directors Carla Cevasco and Matt Hueston. It was founded by Angus Kress Gillespie. Each year also sees a Student Intern Team in positions including Stage Management, Outreach, Communications, Logistics, Curatorial Programs, Artists Relations, and more.

The following essays provide more information about the festival and its history:

- The Founding of the New Jersey Folk Festival by Angus Kress Gillespie
- Beyond the Ivory Tower by Angus Kress Gillespie
- Managing the New Jersey Folk Festival by Bill Seldon

== A student-run event ==
This festival is the product of a class intended, in part, to provide students with leadership opportunities. The festival is one of only a handful in the United States managed by undergraduate students. Collectively, the staff is responsible for continuing the festival's mission of celebrating the diverse multicultural and indigenous folk life of New Jersey.

In 1975, when the festival first began, only two students were involved in its organization and management. Today, about ten students serve on the planning committee. Alumni of the festival also serve as advisors to the committee.

The class meets for three hours once a week under the direction of faculty advisor Maria Kennedy. During the first half of the class, there is academic instruction in which the students learn about folklore, including the distinction between "traditional" versus "revival" folk music, theoretical problems associated with publicly presenting ethnic culture, the history and aesthetic sensibilities of the craft presenters and performers, as well as more practical instruction in how to write press releases or conduct radio interviews. The second half of the class functions as a business meeting led by the festival manager, complete with progress reports from coordinators, "breakaway" management teamwork sessions, and problem-solving.

The student coordinators form a closely knit team, where they develop leadership and management skills, written and verbal communication, organization, personal assertiveness, and time management. The class is part of the curriculum of the American Studies Department of Rutgers.

== Festival areas ==
=== The Angus Gillespie Stage ===
This is the main stage for various musical performances throughout the day.

=== Jam Tent ===
This will be an informal venue for musicians to gather and share information on their instruments, performing, and song writing.

=== Speaker Tent ===
Also known as the "Seminar Tent," this will be a venue for scholars to discuss educational programs related to the mission of the folk festival.

=== Heritage Area ===
The Heritage Area showcases crafters doing live demonstrations of their craft techniques and knowledge of materials, design and craft history, as well as how and where they market their creations.

=== Craft Market ===
The Craft Market consists of vendors and skilled craftspeople throughout New Jersey and beyond. The focus of the craft market is on traditional folk art crafts. The work of each vendor has been pre-screened for top-notch quality. Crafts include jewelry, woodwork, pottery, glassware, ceramics, and clothing.

=== Food Services ===
Rutgers University will manage food services and food distribution at the folk festival.

=== Children's Activities Area ===
The Children's Activities Area offers a wide variety of free activities including games, crafts, face painting, take-home crafts, and pie-eating contests.

=== Folk Marketplace ===
At Folk Marketplace, personnel can answer general inquiries about the festival. Performance schedules and merchandise are available.

== Festival logo ==
The Jersey Devil serves as the official logo of the New Jersey Folk Festival. However, every year, a new logo embodying the current year's festival highlight is designed and used.

=== Original logo ===
The original festival logo was the rooster. Back in 1975, the festival was managed by three people; Angus Kress Gillespie as the director, Kathy DeAngelo as the music coordinator, and Barbara Irwin as the crafts coordinator. When choosing a logo, the original committee turned to the folk art collection of the Newark Museum of Art. There they found the cock weather vane made of copper in 19th century rural New Jersey. They felt that this rooster served as a fine symbol of the folk culture found in New Jersey in earlier days.

Erwin Christensen in The Index of American Design explains that the rooster is probably the earliest weathervane design in the United States. This preference may be explained by the widespread use of this symbol on church steeples in Europe. According to tradition, the cock owed its place on church spires to Peter's denial of Christ. Hence, it served as a warning to the congregation not to do the same. In the Bayeux Tapestry of the 1070s, originally of the Bayeux Cathedral (Cathédrale Notre-Dame de Bayeux) and now exhibited at Musée de la Tapisserie de Bayeux in Bayeux, Normandy, there is a depiction of a man installing a cock on Westminster Abbey. Also, it is reputed through Papal enactment that in the 9th century Pope Nicholas I ordered the figure to be placed on every church steeple and even previous to that Pope Leo IV had it placed on the Old St. Peter's Basilica or old Constantinian basilica even before Nicholas I was Pope.

== Previous festival highlights ==
- 2026 - 51st Anniversary
- 2025 - 50th Anniversary - Celebrating New Jersey
- 2024 – Garden State: Cultures of Cultivation
- 2023 – New Directions in Folk
- 2022 – On the Move: Transportation and Migration
- 2021 – Oaxaca
- 2020 – Oaxaca
- 2019 – Best of the past 4 years (45th Annual)
- 2018 – Native Americans of New Jersey
- 2017 – Turkish Traditions
- 2016 – Bluegrass Showcase
- 2015 – Maritime
- 2014 – 40th Anniversary
- 2013 – Garifuna Folk Culture
- 2012 – Bulgarian Folk Culture
- 2011 – Kalmyk Folk Culture
- 2010 – The Andes
- 2009 – 35th Anniversary Celebration
- 2008 – German-American Traditions
- 2007 – Dominican-American Traditions
- 2006 – Charm of Korea
- 2005 – Norwegian-American Traditions
- 2004 – 30th Anniversary Celebration
- 2003 – Mexican-American Traditions
- 2002 – Blues &amp; Gospel
- 2001 – Portuguese-American Traditions
- 2000 – Women in Folk
- 1999 – Silver Jubilee Celebration
- 1998 – Chinese-American Traditions
- 1997 – India
- 1996 – South Jersey
- 1995 – Puerto Rico
- 1994 – 20th Anniversary Celebration
- 1993 – Lebanon
- 1992 – American Indians
- 1991 – Haiti
- 1990 – Greece
- 1989 – Ireland
- 1988 – Sweden
- 1987 – Philippines
- 1986 – Italy
- 1985 – Scottish Traditions in America
- 1984 – Cuban Ties
- 1983 – Hungarian-Americans
- 1982 – Holland-American Culture
- 1981 – 200 Years of NJ Agriculture
- 1980 – New Brunswick Folklore
- 1979 – Folk Heritage
- 1978 – Folk Heritage
- 1977 – Folk Heritage
- 1976 – Folk Heritage
- 1975 – Folk Heritage

== Online essays, news articles ==
The following links provide information on the history of the New Jersey Folk Festival:

- "The Legend of the New Jersey Folk Festival" - Rutgers Today
- "Professor's legacy lies with folk festival tradition" - The Daily Targum
- "New Jersey Folk Festival Leans Towards South America" - nj.com
- "New Jersey Folk Festival Bridges Tradition and Innovation" - New Jersey Stage
- "New Jersey Folk Festival has been building students’ skills for 40 years" - My Central Jersey
- "Angus Gillespie bids farewell as director of the NJ Folk Festival in New Brunswick" - Asbury Park Press
