= On the Banks of the Old Raritan =

Song associated with Rutgers University

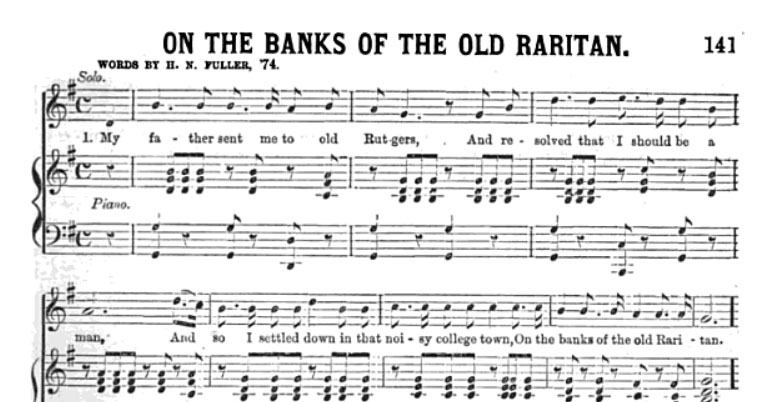
The first few measures of the original version of Rutgers alma mater, "On the Banks of the Old Raritan"

"On the Banks of the Old Raritan" is a song, or alma mater, associated with Rutgers, The State University of New Jersey (previously Rutgers College and Rutgers University), in the United States. The original lyrics were written in 1873 by Howard Newton Fuller, an 1874 graduate of Rutgers College. Fuller quickly prepared the song as a school hymn for the college's Glee Club, an all-male choral ensemble, before a performance in Metuchen, New Jersey. Fuller chose to set the lyrics to the tune of melody, "On the Banks of the Old Dundee", a popular Scottish melody regarded as a drinking song, and titled the song for the Raritan River.

== Composition and history ==
Rutgers College student Edwin E. Colburn (class of 1876) organized the college's Glee Club, an all-male choral ensemble, after noticing that Rutgers was not included when the first edition of the Carmina Collegensia (1869) was published and advertised as a complete collection of American college songs. In 1873, on the night of a performance in Metuchen, New Jersey, Colburn approached his fellow student Howard Newton Fuller (1853– ), to compose a tune and some lyrics that the club could use as an official school song, or alma mater.

Fuller wrote the lyrics in two hours setting them to the tune of a popular melody On the Banks of the Old Dundee. According to a later interview with the Rutgers Alumni Monthly, Fuller stated he chose "On the Banks of the Old Dundee" as the song "immediately struck me that the air of that song had the right melody and the stirring and martial swing for an effective college song."

"On the Banks of the Old Raritan" and thirteen other Rutgers songs appeared in the second edition of the Carmina Collegensia, published in 1876.

It is often sung at university occasions, including performances of the Rutgers University Glee Club, and other campus musical groups, at convocation and commencement exercises, and especially at the conclusion of athletic events.

== Lyrics ==
While there are five verses to the song, typically only the first and last (fifth) verse are sung.

Revised lyrics (1914)

My father sent me to old Rutgers,
And resolv'd that I should be a man;
And so I settled down,
In that noisy college town,
On the banks of the old Raritan.

Chorus:
On the banks of the old Raritan, my boys,^{β}
where old Rutgers ever more shall stand,
For has she not stood since the time of the flood,
On the banks of the old Raritan.

Her ardent spirit stirred and cheered me
From the day me college years began;
Gracious Alma Mater mine;
Learning's fair and honored shrine;
On the banks of the old Raritan.

Chorus

I love her flaming far-flung banner
I love her triumphs proud to scan,
And I glory in her fame
That's immortalized her name.
On the banks of the old Raritan.

Chorus

My heart clings closer than the ivy
As life runs out its fleeting span,
To the stately, ancient walls
Of her hallowed, classic halls
On the banks of the old Raritan.

Chorus

Then sing aloud to Alma Mater,
And keep the scarlet in the van';
For with her motto high,
Rutgers' name shall never die,
On the banks of the old Raritan.

Chorus

Original lyrics (1873)

My father sent me to old Rutgers,
And resolv'd that I should be a man;
And so I settled down,
In that noisy college town,
On the banks of the old Raritan.

Chorus:
On the banks of the old Raritan, my boys,
where old Rutgers ever more shall stand,
For has she not stood since the time of the flood,
On the banks of the old Raritan.

As Fresh, they used me rather roughly,
But I the fearful gauntlet ran,
And they shook me so about
That they turned me inside out,
On the banks of the old Raritan.

Chorus

I passed through all these tortures nobly,
And then, as Soph, my turn began,
And I hazed the poor Fresh so,
That they longed for Heaven, I know,
On the banks of the old Raritan.

Chorus

And then I rested at my pleasure,
And steered quite clear of Prex's ban,
And the stars their good-bye kissing
Found me not from euchre missing,
On the banks of the old Raritan.

Chorus

And soon I made my social entrée
When I laid full many a wicked plan,
And by my cunning art
Slew many a maiden's heart,
On the banks of the old Raritan.

Chorus

Then sing aloud to Alma Mater,
And keep the Scarlet in the van;
For with her motto high
Rutgers' name shall never die
On the banks of the old Raritan.

Chorus

In 1989, several years after Rutgers became coeducational (1972), the University's administration changed the official lyrics to reflect to be gender-neutral, substituting the words "my friends" in place of Fuller's original words "my boys" in the first line of the chorus.

In August 2013, The Rutgers University Glee Club debuted a revision to the first verse, written by Rutgers Director of Choral Studies Patrick Gardner. The lyrics, "My father sent me to old Rutgers, and resolved that I should be a man" has been changed to a gender-neutral "From far and near we came to Rutgers, and resolved to learn all that we can." The following line was also changed to "we settled down" instead of "I settled down". These lyrics were carefully changed so that whether you choose to sing the Howard Fuller 1873 lyrics or the gender-inclusive revision, the vowel color are unified across both. (I.E. "Father" matches "Far", the word "resolved" remained the same, "man" and "can", etc.) The revision has been accepted by the university.

Over the years, several organizations on campus have penned additional verses, informal interjections, as well as parodies of these lyrics.

== Camden campus alma mater ==
An altered version of the song with lyrics by alums Kenneth E. Kendall and Julie E. Kendall is sung as the Rutgers University-Camden alma mater, incorporating the lyrics "on the banks of the old Delaware" and references to the Camden-based poet Walt Whitman.
