= Rutgers University =

Public research university in New Jersey, US

Coordinates: 40°30′6″N 74°26′53″W

Rutgers, The State University of New Jersey
- Former names: Queen's College (1766–1825); Rutgers College (1825–1924); Rutgers University (1924–1945)
- Motto: Sol iustitiae et occidentem illustra (Latin)
- Motto in English: "Sun of righteousness, shine also upon the West."
- Type: Private college (1766–1945); Public land-grant research university
- Established: November 10, 1766; 259 years ago
- Accreditation: MSCHE
- Religious affiliation: Nonsectarian - historically Dutch Reformed
- Academic affiliations: AAU; CUMU; ORAU; URA; sea-grant; space-grant
- Endowment: $2.35 billion (2025) (system-wide)
- President: William F. Tate IV
- Academic staff: 4,314
- Administrative staff: 6,757
- Students: 68,942
- Undergraduates: 49,359
- Postgraduates: 19,583
- Location: New Brunswick–Piscataway, New Jersey, United States
- Campus: 6,088 acres (2,464 ha); Small city
- Other campuses: Blackwood; Camden; Newark; Scotch Plains; Stratford
- Newspaper: The Daily Targum; The Observer; The Gleaner
- Colors: Scarlet and white
- Nicknames: Scarlet Knights; Scarlet Raptors; Scarlet Raiders
- Sporting affiliations: NCAA Division I FBS – Big Ten; NJAC; CVC
- Mascots: Sir Henry, the Scarlet Knight
- Website: rutgers.edu

Rutgers, The State University of New Jersey, commonly referred to as Rutgers University or simply Rutgers (/ˈrʌtɡərz/ RUT-gərz), is a large public land-grant research university consisting of three campuses in New Jersey. Chartered in 1766, Rutgers was originally called Queen's College and was affiliated with the Dutch Reformed Church. It is the eighth-oldest college in the United States, the second-oldest in New Jersey (after Princeton University), and one of nine colonial colleges that were chartered before the American Revolution.

In 1825, Queen's College was renamed Rutgers College in honor of Colonel Henry Rutgers, whose substantial gift to the school had stabilized its finances during a period of uncertainty. From its founding to the mid-20th century, Rutgers was a private liberal arts college. It has evolved into a major public research university since being designated the State University of New Jersey by the state's legislature in 1945 and 1956.

Rutgers encompasses several distinct campuses. Since colonial times, Rutgers' historic core has been located along College Avenue at the College Avenue Campus in New Brunswick, New Jersey, as part of Rutgers University–New Brunswick. Rutgers–New Brunswick includes the Douglass and Cook campuses, both primarily in the city of New Brunswick, as well as both the Busch and Livingston campuses on the north side of the Raritan River in Piscataway. Rutgers also makes use of many buildings throughout downtown New Brunswick. Two other major campuses are located at Rutgers University–Newark, and Rutgers University–Camden. The university has additional facilities located throughout the state, including oceanographic research facilities at the Jersey Shore.

Rutgers is a land-grant, sea-grant, and space-grant university, as well as the largest university in the state. Instruction is offered by more than 9,930 faculty members in 175 academic departments to over 51,400 undergraduate students and more than 19,400 graduate students. As of Fall 2026, Rutgers University enrolls over 71,000 students across its three campuses, making it one of the largest universities in the United States. The university is accredited by the Middle States Commission on Higher Education and is a member of the Association of American Universities and the Universities Research Association.

== History ==
=== 18th century ===
Two decades after the College of New Jersey, now Princeton University, was established in 1746 by the New Light Presbyterians, ministers of the Dutch Reformed Church, seeking autonomy in ecclesiastical affairs in the Thirteen Colonies, sought to establish a college to train those who wanted to become ministers within the Dutch Reformed Church in the colony. This religious organization developed into the Reformed Church in America.

The university's coat of arms, featuring four quarters, a reference to the shields of the House of Orange-Nassau (for William III of Orange and England, New Jersey, Queen Charlotte of Mecklenburg-Strelitz, and Henry Rutgers

Through several years of effort by Theodorus Jacobus Frelinghuysen (1691–1747) and Jacob Rutsen Hardenbergh (1736–1790), later the college's first president, Queen's College received its charter on November 10, 1766, from New Jersey's last royal governor, William Franklin (1730–1813), the son of Benjamin Franklin. The original charter established the college under the corporate name the trustees of Queen's College, in New-Jersey, named in honor of Queen Charlotte (1744–1818), and created both the college and the Queen's College Grammar School, intended to be a preparatory school affiliated and governed by the college. The Grammar School, today the private Rutgers Preparatory School, was a part of the college community until 1959. New Brunswick was chosen as the location over Hackensack because the New Brunswick Dutch had the support of the Anglican population, making the royal charter easier to obtain.

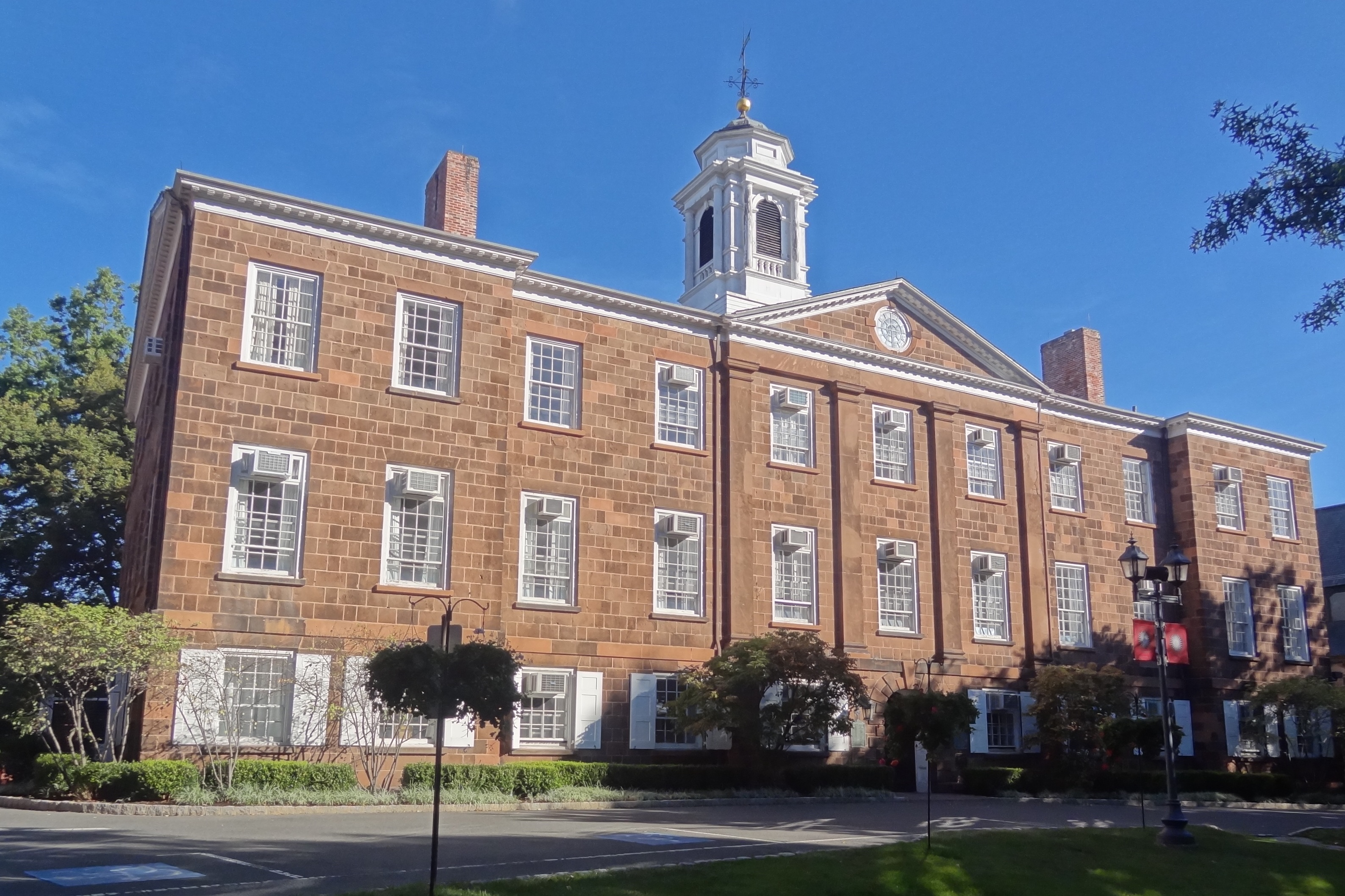
Old Queens, the oldest building at Rutgers University in New Brunswick, built between 1809 and 1825, houses much of the Rutgers University administration.

The original purpose of Queen's College was to "educate the youth in language, liberal, the divinity, and useful arts and sciences" and for the training of future ministers for the Dutch Reformed Church.

In 1771, the college admitted its first students, which included a single sophomore and a handful of first-year students taught by a lone instructor, and granted its first degree in 1774, to Matthew Leydt. Despite the religious nature of the early college, the first classes were held at a tavern called the Sign of the Red Lion. When the Revolutionary War broke out and taverns were suspected by the British as being hotbeds of rebel activity, the college abandoned the tavern and held classes in private homes.

Like many colleges founded in the U.S. during this time, Rutgers benefited from slave labor and funds derived from purchasing and selling enslaved people. Research undertaken at the university in the 2010s began to uncover and document these connections, including the university's foundation on land taken from the indigenous Lenape people.

=== 19th century ===
In its early years, due to a lack of funds, Queen's College was closed for two extended periods. Early trustees considered merging the college with the College of New Jersey, in Princeton, but the measure failed by one vote. They later considered relocating it to New York City. In 1808, after raising $12,000, the college temporarily reopened and broke ground on a building of its own, called "Old Queens", designed by architect John McComb Jr. The college's third president, Ira Condict, laid the cornerstone on April 27, 1809. Shortly after, the New Brunswick Theological Seminary, founded in 1784, relocated from Brooklyn, to New Brunswick, and shared facilities with Queen's College and the Queen's College Grammar School, and all three institutions were then overseen by the Reformed Church in America. During those formative years, all three institutions fit into Old Queens. In 1830, Queen's College Grammar School moved across the street, and in 1856, the seminary relocated to a seven-acre (28,000 m^{2}) tract less than one-half mile (800 m) away.

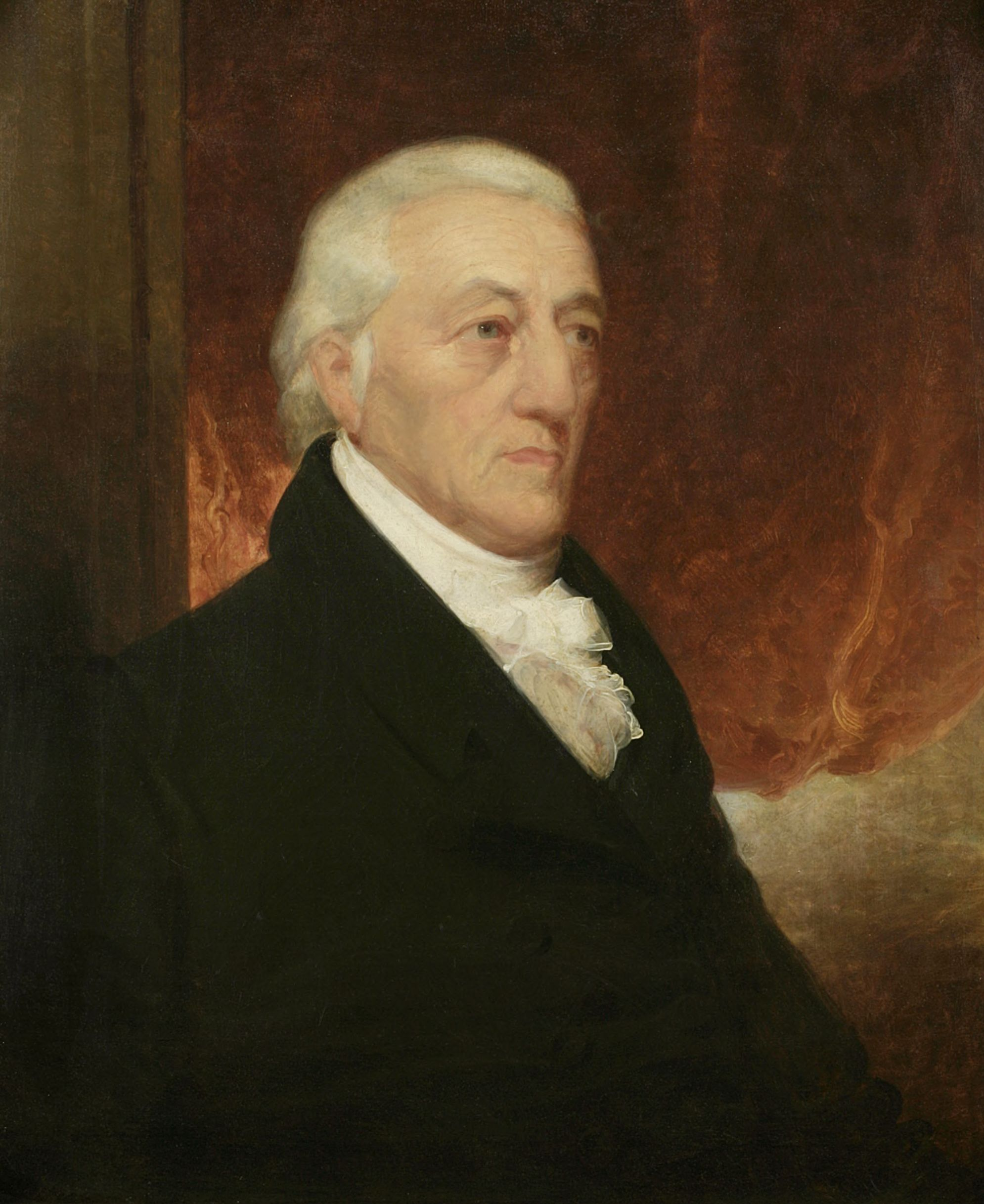
Colonel Henry Rutgers (1745–1830), an early benefactor and the namesake of Rutgers University

After several years of closure resulting from an economic depression after the War of 1812, Queen's College reopened in 1825 and was renamed "Rutgers College" in honor of American Revolutionary War hero Henry Rutgers (1745–1830). According to the board of trustees, Colonel Rutgers was honored because he epitomized Christian ethics. A year after the school was renamed, it received two donations from its namesake: a $200 bell still hanging from the cupola of Old Queen's and a $5,000 bond (equivalent to $142,000 in 2025) which placed the college on sound financial footing.

Rutgers College became the land-grant college of New Jersey in 1864 under the Morrill Act of 1862, resulting in the establishment of the Rutgers Scientific School, featuring departments of agriculture, engineering, and chemistry. The Rutgers Scientific School would expand over the years to grow into the New Jersey Agricultural Experiment Station (1880) and divide into the College of Engineering (1914) and the College of Agriculture (1921). Rutgers created the New Jersey College for Women in 1918, and the School of Education in 1924.

=== 20th century ===
With the development of graduate education, and the continued expansion of the institution, the collection of schools became Rutgers University in 1924. Rutgers College continued as a liberal arts college within the university. Later, University College (1945) was founded to serve part-time, commuting students and Livingston College (1969) was created by the Rutgers Trustees, ensuring that the interests of ethnically diverse New Jersey students were met.

Rutgers was designated the state university of New Jersey by acts of the New Jersey Legislature in 1945 and 1956. Although Rutgers thus became a public university, it still retains—as the successor to the private college founded and chartered in 1766—some private rights and protections regarding its fundamental character and mission.

The newly-designated state university absorbed the University of Newark in 1946 and then the College of South Jersey and South Jersey Law School in 1950. These two institutions became Rutgers University–Newark and Rutgers University–Camden, respectively. On September 10, 1970, the board of governors voted to admit women into Rutgers College.

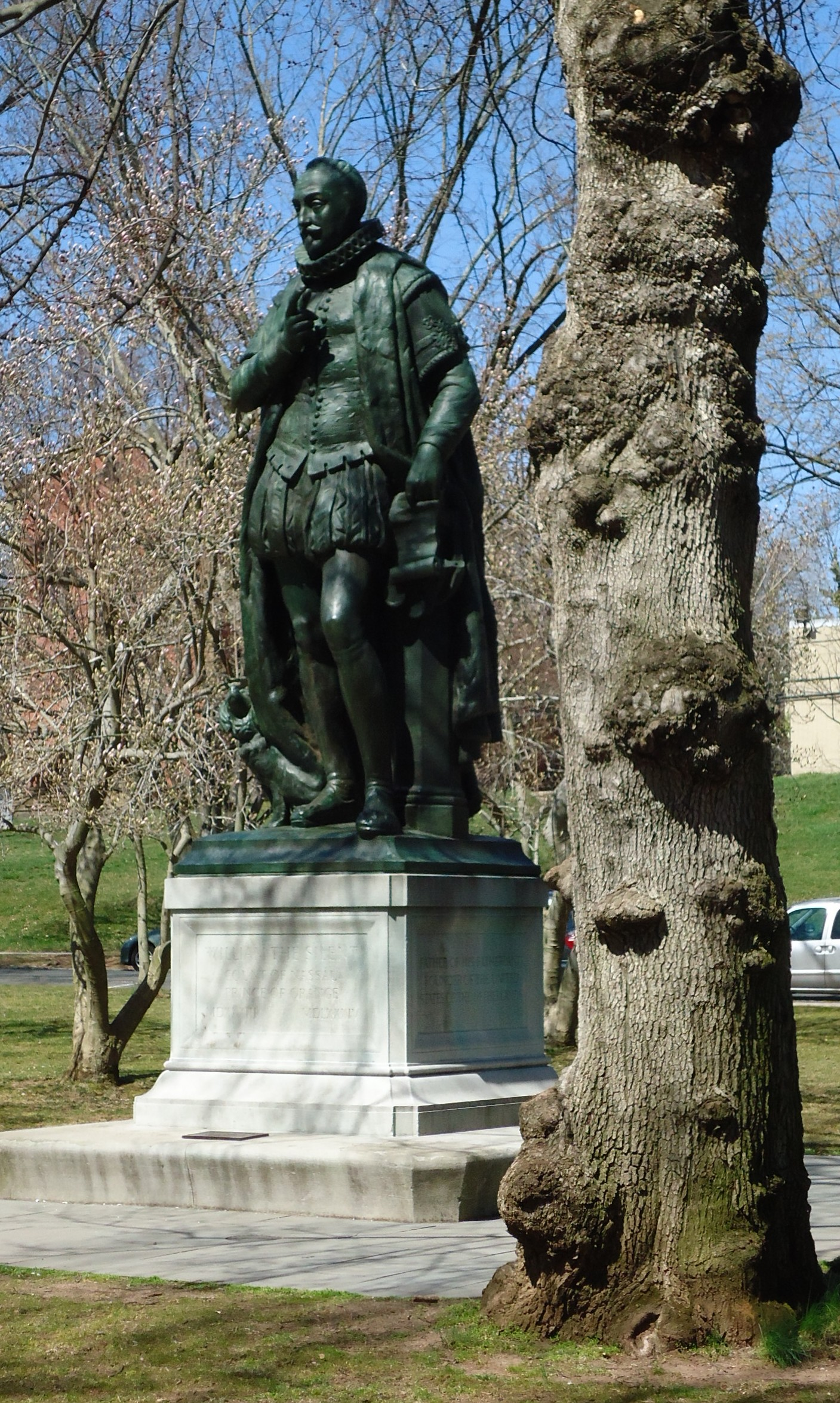
On the western end of Voorhees Mall is a bronze statue of William the Silent, commemorating the university's Dutch heritage.

There were setbacks in the growth of the university. In 1967, the Rutgers Physics Department had a Centers of Excellence Grant from the NSF which allowed the physics department to hire several faculty each year. These faculty were to be paid by the grant for three years, but after that time any faculty hired with the associate or full professor designation would become tenured. The governor and the chancellor forced Rutgers to lose this grant by rejecting the condition that tenure be granted.

In 1970, the newly formed Rutgers Medical School hired major faculty members from other institutions. In 1971, the governor's office separated Rutgers Medical School from Rutgers University and made it part of New Jersey College of Medicine and Dentistry, and many faculty left the medical school, including the dean of the medical school, Dewitt Stetten, who later became the director of the National Institutes of Health. As a result of the separation of the medical school from Rutgers University, Ph.D. programs that had been started in the medical center were lost, and students had to seek other institutions to finish their degrees. After the dissolution of the University of Medicine and Dentistry in 2013, the medical school again became part of the university.

Before 1982, separate liberal arts faculties existed in the several separate "residential colleges" (Rutgers, Douglass, Livingston, University, and Cook colleges) at Rutgers–New Brunswick.

In 1982, under president Edward J. Bloustein, the liberal arts faculties of these five institutions were centralized into one college, the Faculty of Arts and Sciences, which itself had no students. The separate residential colleges persisted for students, and while instructors for classes were now drawn from the Faculty of Arts and Sciences, separate standards for admission, good standing, and graduation continued for students, depending on which residential college they were enrolled in. In January 1987, around 2,800 non-teaching employees went on strike for increased salaries, which ended after nine days after an agreement with the administration was made.

=== 21st century ===
In 2007, Rutgers New Brunswick, Douglass, Livingston, and University Colleges, along with the Faculty of Arts and Sciences were merged into the new "School of Arts and Sciences" with one set of admissions criteria, curriculum, and graduation requirements. At this time, the liberal arts components of Cook College were absorbed into the School of Arts and Sciences as well, while the other aspects of that college remained, but as the School of Environmental and Biological Sciences. These changes in 2007 ended the 241-year history of Rutgers College as a distinct institution.

Students at the 2011 Rutgers tuition protests fought against rising education costs and diminished state subsidies. Campus groups (including the Rutgers Student Union, the Rutgers One Coalition, and the Rutgers University Student Assembly (RUSA), supported by New Jersey United Students (NJUS), mobilized to keep the increase in annual student financial obligation to a minimum through marches, sit-ins, letters to administration officials and forums.

In 2011, there was an attempt by former New Jersey governor Chris Christie and members of the legislature to merge Rutgers–Camden into Rowan University, it ultimately was rejected in part due to several on-campus protests and pushback from Camden faculty, students, and alumni.

On June 20, 2012, the outgoing president of Rutgers University, Richard L. McCormick, announced that Rutgers will "integrate five acres along George Street between Seminary Place and Bishop Place into the College Avenue Campus." Most of the block had been occupied by the New Brunswick Theological Seminary. Rutgers agreed to rebuild the seminary in exchange for the land.

In 2013, most of the University of Medicine and Dentistry of New Jersey was integrated with Rutgers University and, along with several existing Rutgers units, was reformed as Rutgers Biomedical and Health Sciences. This merger attached the New Jersey Medical School and Robert Wood Johnson Medical School to Rutgers University.

The Rutgers Shield was released on its 250th anniversary in 2015.

In 2013, Rutgers changed part of its alma mater, "On the Banks of the Old Raritan." Where the lyrics had stated, "My father sent me to old Rutgers, and resolved that I should be a man," now they state, "From far and near we came to Rutgers, and resolved to learn all that we can." The song for the Camden campus "On the Banks of the Old Delaware" are lyrically similar aside from the river name.

In 2016, Rutgers celebrated its 250th anniversary. On May 15, President Barack Obama became the first sitting president to speak at the university's commencement. The university held a variety of celebrations, academic programs, and commemorative events which culminated on the 250th anniversary date, November 10, 2016.

In November 2016, Rutgers released research findings that revealed "an untold history of some of the institution's founders as slave owners and the displacement of the Native Americans who once occupied land that was later transferred to the college."

In January 2020, Jonathan Holloway made history as the first African American and person of color to be named president of Rutgers. On April 9, 2023, three unions voted to go on the first strike by academics in the university's 257-year history. Classes and research were suspended for a week. Five months later, in September, the university's faculty senate voted "no confidence" in Holloway; in addition to issues related to the strikes, the motion also cited Holloway's decision to dismiss the chancellor of the university's Newark campus and his proposal to merge the university's two medical schools.

In May 2026, Rutgers School of Engineering cancelled its May 15, 2026 graduation speech by businessman and alumnus Rami Elghandour after several students complained of his critical social media posts "focused on Israel". The school withdrew Elghandour's invitation to speak after it was "informed that some graduating students would not attend their graduation ceremony due to concerns about the invited speaker’s social media posts." In a statement, Elghandour called the decision "heartbreaking and disappointing." On May 12, 2026, the Rutgers University Senate formally censured Alberto Cuitiño, School of Engineering dean for rescinding Elghandour's invitation to speak.

== Organization and administration ==
=== University president ===
Since 1785, twenty-two men have served as the institution's president, beginning with Jacob Rutsen Hardenbergh, a Dutch Reformed minister who was responsible for establishing the college. Before 1930, most of the university's presidents were clergy affiliated with Christian denominations in the Reformed tradition. Two presidents were alumni of Rutgers College—William H. S. Demarest (Class of 1883) and Philip Milledoler Brett (Class of 1892).

The president serves in an ex officio capacity as a presiding officer within the university's 59-member board of trustees and its eleven-member board of governors, and is appointed by these boards to oversee the day-to-day operations of the university across its campuses. He is charged with implementing "board policies with the help and advice of senior administrators and other members of the university community." The president is responsible only to those two governing boards—there is no oversight by state officials.

The current president is William F. Tate IV, who assumed the role on July 1, 2025. He succeeded the 21st president Jonathan Holloway who assumed office on July 1, 2020.

=== Governing boards ===
Governance at Rutgers University rests with a board of trustees consisting of 41 members, and a board of governors consisting of 15 voting members: eight are appointed by the governor of New Jersey and seven chosen by and from among the board of trustees. The trustees constitute chiefly an advisory body to the board of governors and are the fiduciary overseers of the property and assets of the university that existed before the institution became the State University of New Jersey in 1945. The initial reluctance of the trustees (still acting as a private corporate body) to cede control of certain business affairs to the state government for direction and oversight caused the state to establish the Board of governors in 1956. Today, the board of governors maintains much of the corporate control of the university.

The members of the board of trustees are voted upon by different constituencies or appointed. "Two faculty and two students are elected by the University Senate as nonvoting representatives. The 59 voting members are chosen in the following way as mandated by state law: 20 charter members (of whom at least three shall be women), 16 alumni members nominated by the nominating committee of the board of trustees, and five public members appointed by the governor of the state with confirmation by the New Jersey Senate.

=== Affiliations ===
- Association of American Universities
- Middle States Association of Colleges and Schools
- Big Ten Academic Alliance
- Universities Research Association
- Association of Public and Land-grant Universities
- Big Ten Conference

== Locations and divisions ==
Rutgers University has three campuses in New Jersey. The New Brunswick Campus, located in New Brunswick and adjacent Piscataway, is the largest campus of the university. The Newark Campus in Newark and the Camden Campus in Camden are located in the northern and southern parts of the state, respectively. Combined, these campuses comprise 33 degree-granting schools and colleges, offering undergraduate, graduate, and professional levels of study. The university is centrally administered from New Brunswick, although chancellors at the Newark and Camden campuses hold significant autonomy for some academic issues.

=== Rutgers–New Brunswick ===
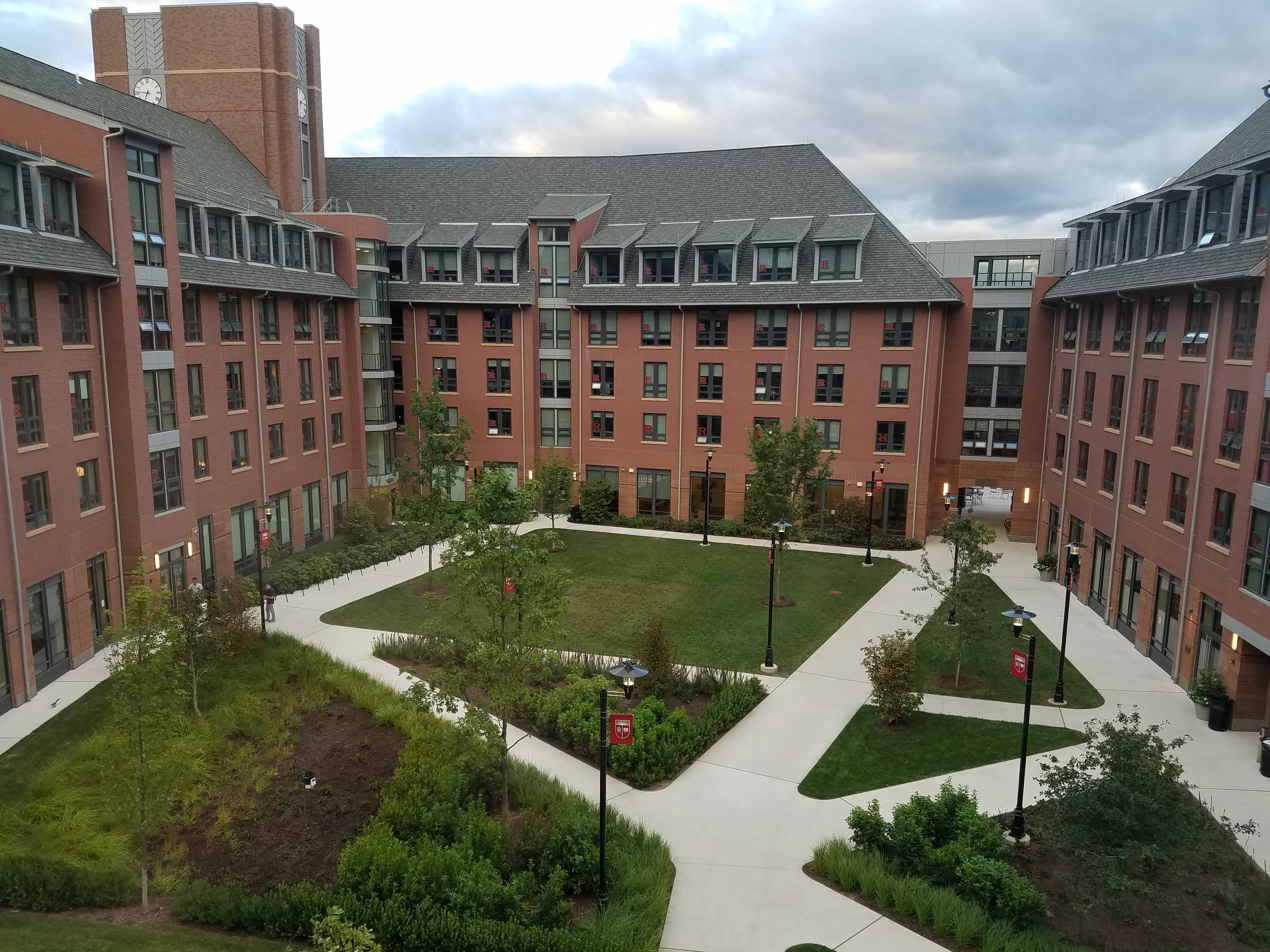
The Honors College at Rutgers University–New Brunswick

The New Brunswick Campus (or Rutgers–New Brunswick) is the largest campus and the site of the original Rutgers College. Spread across six municipalities in Middlesex County, New Jersey, it lies chiefly in the City of New Brunswick and adjacent Piscataway and is composed of five smaller campuses and a few buildings in downtown New Brunswick. The historic College Avenue Campus is close to downtown New Brunswick and includes the seat of the university, Old Queens and other nineteenth-century and early twentieth-century buildings that constitute the Queens Campus and Voorhees Mall. Its proximity to New Brunswick's train station and numerous food vendors located downtown, in addition to a large amount of off-campus housing and fraternity and sorority houses, make this a popular weekend destination.

Across the city, Douglass Campus and Cook Campus are intertwined and often referred to as the Cook/Douglass Campus. Cook Campus has extensive farms and woods that reach North Brunswick and East Brunswick. Separated by the Raritan River is Busch Campus, in Piscataway, and Livingston Campus, also mainly in Piscataway but including remote sections of land extending into Edison and Highland Park. The Busch Campus is noted as the home of Rutgers' highly ranked Ernest Mario School of Pharmacy, as well as the golf course and football stadium. The Livingston campus is home to Jersey Mike's Arena (formerly the Rutgers Athletic Center [RAC]), a trapezoidal building that is home to many sports teams, notably the men's basketball team. Additionally, this campus has undergone many renovations and is regarded as the most "modern" campus. The campus entrance is delineated by the all-glass Rutgers Business School building known as "100 Rock" (because of the building's Piscataway address, 100 Rockafeller Road). Rutgers Campus Buses transport students between the various campuses.

As of 2010, the New Brunswick-Piscataway campuses include 19 undergraduate, graduate, and professional schools, including the School of Arts and Sciences, the School of Communication and Information, the Edward J. Bloustein School of Planning and Public Policy, the School of Engineering, the School of Environmental and Biological Sciences, the Ernest Mario School of Pharmacy, the Graduate School, the Graduate School of Applied and Professional Psychology, the Graduate School of Education, the School of Management and Labor Relations, Mason Gross School of the Arts, the College of Nursing, the Rutgers Business School and the School of Social Work. As of 2012, 40,434 students (31,593 undergraduates and 8,841 graduate students) were enrolled at the New Brunswick-Piscataway campus. The New Brunswick-Piscataway campus includes a Business School building on the Livingston Campus.

=== Rutgers–Newark ===
The Newark Campus (or Rutgers–Newark) consists of eight undergraduate, graduate, and professional schools, including Newark College of Arts and Sciences, University College, School of Criminal Justice, Graduate School, School of Nursing, School of Public Affairs and Administration, Rutgers Business School, and the Newark location of the Rutgers Law School. As of 2012, 7,666 undergraduates and 4,345 graduate students (total 12,011) are enrolled at the Newark campus. Originally the University of Newark, the campus was renamed and rebranded as Rutgers–Newark in 1945.

=== Rutgers–Camden ===
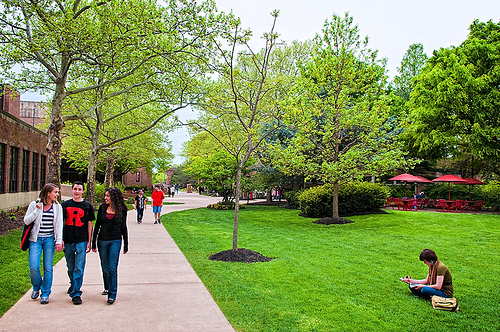
Rutgers University–Camden's quad walk

The Camden Campus (or Rutgers–Camden) consists of six undergraduate, graduate, and professional schools, including Camden College of Arts and Sciences, University College, Graduate School, Rutgers School of Business–Camden, Rutgers School of Nursing–Camden, and the Camden location of the Rutgers Law School. The schools are located in the Cooper's Grant and Central Waterfront neighborhoods of Camden. As of 2012, 4,708 undergraduates and 1,635 graduate students (total 6,343) were enrolled at the Camden campus.

The campus was founded as the College of South Jersey and South Jersey Law School in the 1920s, and became part of Rutgers in 1950.

=== Rutgers Health ===
Rutgers Health (formerly Rutgers Biomedical and Health Sciences) is a division of the university that serves as an umbrella organization for schools, centers, and institutes from Rutgers University and the old University of Medicine and Dentistry of New Jersey. The organization was incorporated into the university following the 2013 merger of Rutgers and UMDNJ. While its various facilities are spread across several locations statewide, Rutgers Biomedical and Health Sciences is considered a "campus" for certain organizational purposes, such as the appointment of a separate chancellor. In July 2023, Rutgers Biomedical and Health Sciences renamed to Rutgers Health.

Rutgers Health comprises nine schools and other research centers and institutes including; Ernest Mario School of Pharmacy, Graduate School of Biomedical Sciences, New Jersey Medical School, Robert Wood Johnson Medical School, School of Nursing, School of Dental Medicine, School of Health Related Professions, the School of Public Health, Cancer Institute of New Jersey, Center for Advanced Biotechnology and Medicine, Environmental and the Occupational Health Sciences Institute, Brain Health Institute, and the Institute for Health, Health Care Policy, and Aging Research. The programs are offered at different location sites across New Jersey in New Brunswick, Newark, Blackwood, Stratford and Scotch Plains, New Jersey.

=== Rutgers-Online ===
As of 2015, Rutgers offered a total of 11 fully online degree programs at the undergraduate and graduate levels. Online degree programs at Rutgers must meet the same academic expectations, in terms of both teaching and learning outcomes, as traditional on-campus programs. During the COVID-19 pandemic, a majority of courses were conducted through remote instruction.

=== Satellite Campuses ===
Rutgers offers classes at several off-campus sites in affiliation with community colleges and other state colleges throughout New Jersey. These partnerships are designed to enable students to achieve a seamless transfer to Rutgers and to take all of their Rutgers classes in a select number of the most popular majors at the community college campus. The collaborative effort provides access to Rutgers faculty teaching Rutgers courses, at a convenient location, but it is also one of the few programs that cater exclusively to the non-traditional student population. Rutgers' current partners include Atlantic Cape, Brookdale, Mercer, Morris, and Camden community colleges.

== Academics ==
The university offers more than 100 distinct bachelor, 100 masters, and 80 doctoral and professional degree programs across 175 academic departments, 29 degree-granting schools, and colleges, 16 of which offer graduate programs of study.

It is accredited by the Commission on Higher Education of the Middle States Association of Colleges and Schools (1921), and in 1989, became a member of the Association of American Universities, an organization of the 62 leading research universities in North America. Rutgers–New Brunswick is classified among "R1: Doctoral Universities – Very high research activity". Rutgers–Newark and Rutgers–Camden are classified by the same organization as "R2: Doctoral Universities – High research activity".

=== Admissions ===
==== Undergraduate ====
Undergraduate admissions statistics
- 2021 entering class
- Admit rate: 68.2 (▲ +11.3)
- Yield rate: 24.2 (▼ −6.8)

Test scores middle 50%^{[i]}
- SAT Total: 1240–1470 (among 45% of FTFs)
- ACT Composite: 27–33 (among 7% of FTFs)

U.S. News & World Report considers the New Brunswick campus of Rutgers University to be a "more selective" school in terms of the rigor of its admissions processes. For the Class of 2025 (enrolling fall 2021), the New Brunswick campus received 43,161 applications and accepted 29,419 (68.2%). The number enrolling was 7,105; the yield rate (the percentage of accepted students who enroll) was 24.2%. The freshman retention rate is 94%, with 83.8% going on to graduate within six years. Rutgers is classified among "R1: Doctoral Universities – Very high research activity," reflecting its extensive research output and doctoral programs.

Of the 45% of the incoming freshman class who submitted SAT scores; the middle 50 percent Composite scores were 1240-1470. Of the 7% of enrolled freshmen in 2021 who submitted ACT scores; the middle 50 percent Composite score was between 27 and 33.

Rutgers, the State University of New Jersey is a college-sponsor of the National Merit Scholarship Program and sponsored 21 Merit Scholarship awards in 2020. In the 2020–2021 academic year, 29 freshman students were National Merit Scholars.

Fall first-time freshman statistics
	2021	2020	2019	2018	2017	2016
Applicants	43,161	41,263	41,286	41,348	38,384	36,677
Admits	29,419	27,618	25,277	24,854	22,186	20,884
Admit rate	68.2	66.9	61.2	60.1	57.8	56.9
Enrolled	7,105	6,551	7,315	7,036	6,268	6,466
Yield rate	24.2	23.7	28.9	28.3	28.3	31.0
ACT composite* (out of 36)	27-33 (7%^{†})	25-32 (18%^{†})	25-32 (18%^{†})	25-31 (25%^{†})	—	—
SAT composite* (out of 1600)	1240-1470 (45%^{†})	1180-1410 (90%^{†})	1210-1430 (90%^{†})	1190-1410 (87%^{†})	1190-1400 (81%^{†})	—
* middle 50% range^{†} percentage of first-time freshmen who chose to submit

=== Financial aid ===
As a state university, Rutgers charges two separate rates for tuition and fees, depending on an enrolled student's residency. The Office of Institutional Research and Academic Planning estimates that the cost of in-state students of attending Rutgers would amount to $25,566 for an undergraduate living on campus and $30,069 for a graduate student. For an out-of-state student, the costs rise to $38,228 and $39,069 respectively. As of the 2024–2025 academic school year, the estimated cost of tuition for in-state students was $14,222, $33,734 for out-of-state students, and $15,332 for room and board.

In the 2010–2011 academic year, undergraduate students at Rutgers, through a combination of federal (53.5%), state (23.6%), university (18.1%), and private (4.8%) scholarships, loans, and grants, received $492,260,845 of financial aid. 81.4% of all undergraduates, or 34,473 students, received some form of financial aid. During the same period, graduate students, through a combination of federal (61.9%), state (1.8%), university (34.5%), and private (1.9%) scholarships, loans, and grants received $182,384,256 of financial aid. 81.5% of all graduate students, or 11,852 students received some form of financial aid.

Alongside the Pell and TAG grants, which are well-known federal and state aids, Rutgers provides the EOF grant, merit-based scholarships such as the SAS Excellence Award, Scarlet Guarantee, and many other forms of aid. Rutgers is an active participant in the EOF program, giving financially or academically disadvantaged students resources. The Scarlet Guarantee covers any tuition cost for students whose aid might not cover this, if the student's household income is below a certain amount. Apart from need-based aid, Rutgers University has a list of scholarships which first-time or continuing students can apply for, based up GPA and/or extra-curriculum involvement. The university also offers multiple opportunities for students to earn while in college through federal work study, on-campus employment, and internships.

In 2007, the university's Office for Enrollment Management launched the Rutgers Future Scholars Program as an initiative to help 7th graders from low-income families achieve academic success and be the first in their families to go to college. The program targets students from the school systems of Rutgers's hometowns, New Brunswick/Piscataway, Newark, and Camden. Once admitted, the students receive mentoring and college prep courses each summer leading up to the year of their college applications. If admitted to the university, they are given a full tuition scholarship for four years of undergraduate study. The program has been very successful and currently admits as many as 200 new 7th graders each year, with most of the original 200 now attending the university as undergraduates.

=== Academic support ===
Rutgers University has a variety of resources to help students succeed academically. It offers academic counselling to help students plan a study schedule, plan a schedule for the semester, decide their major, and complete their major requirements in time. The Learning Centers at Rutgers provide peer tutoring and study groups where students can work with, or receive help from, others who are taking or have taken the same courses. Some courses, such as the Computer Science program, offers tutoring from RUCATS (Rutgers Computing Academic Tutoring for Students). Students can use resources such as the Penji app to find academic support. Rutgers offers these academic support resources for free to its students.

=== Rankings ===
Academic rankings

National
- Forbes: 49
- U.S. News & World Report: 40
- Washington Monthly: 62
- WSJ/College Pulse: 136

Global
- ARWU: 101–150
- QS: 328
- THE: 201–250
- U.S. News & World Report: 143

In the 2025 U.S. News & World Report rankings of universities in the United States, the New Brunswick campus of Rutgers is tied for 41st among national universities overall and ranked tied for 15th among public universities. U.S. News & World Report ranked the Camden campus 127th among national universities, and 18th in top performers for social mobility. The same ranking placed Rutgers-New Brunswick in the top 25 among all U.S. universities for the following graduate school programs: Library Science (7th), English (15th), Fine Arts (23rd), History (21st) with the subspecialties of Women's History and African-American History both ranked 1st, Social Work (17th), and Mathematics (22nd).

U.S. News ranked Rutgers-Camden 58th for graduate nursing programs, and 83rd among graduate public policy programs, and 49th for top public universities. Rutgers University-New Brunswick has consistently ranked 2nd for Philosophy according the QS World University Rankings and the Philosophy Gourmet Report. QS ranks Rutgers 42nd nationally.

The Center for World University Rankings (CWUR) ranks Rutgers-New Brunswick 29th nationally and 50th globally as of 2020–2021. QS Top Universities ranked Rutgers-New Brunswick 264 in the world in 2022.

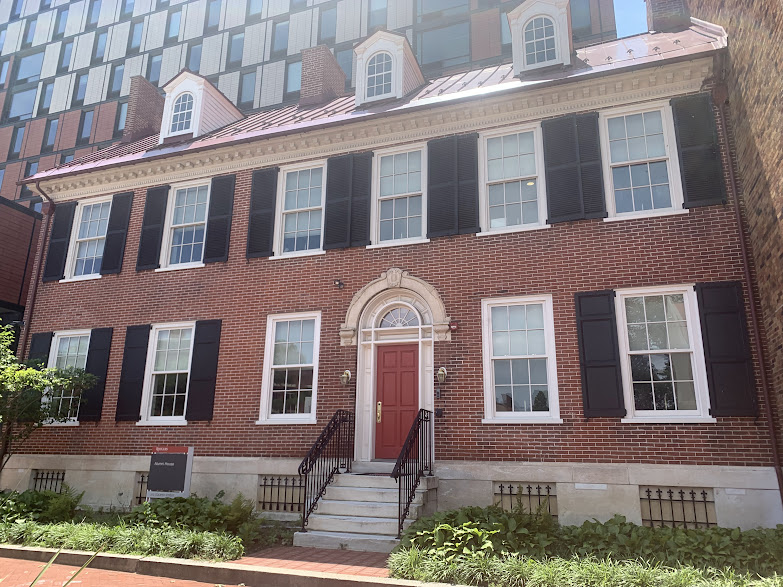
Rutgers Alumni House in Camden

U.S. News & World Report's ranking placed Rutgers-New Brunswick 130th in Best Global Universities, 15th in public universities in the US (2025), 47th in Agricultural Sciences, 45th in Arts and Humanities (tie), 61st in Mathematics, 66th in Cell Biology, 63rd in Economics and Business, 99th in Computer Science, 37th in Pharmacology and Toxicology, and 23rd in Food Science and Technology. The RBS Master of Quantitative Finance (M.Q.F.) program, and the Master of Mathematical Finance (M.S.M.F) program in the department of mathematics, are ranked 7th in the United States.

Under the New Jersey Medical and Health Sciences Education Restructuring Act of 2012, the University of Medicine and Dentistry of New Jersey was dissolved. Most of its schools, including Robert Wood Johnson Medical School, New Jersey Medical School, and New Jersey Dental School, were merged into the new Rutgers Biomedical and Health Sciences, formed in 2013.

=== Libraries ===
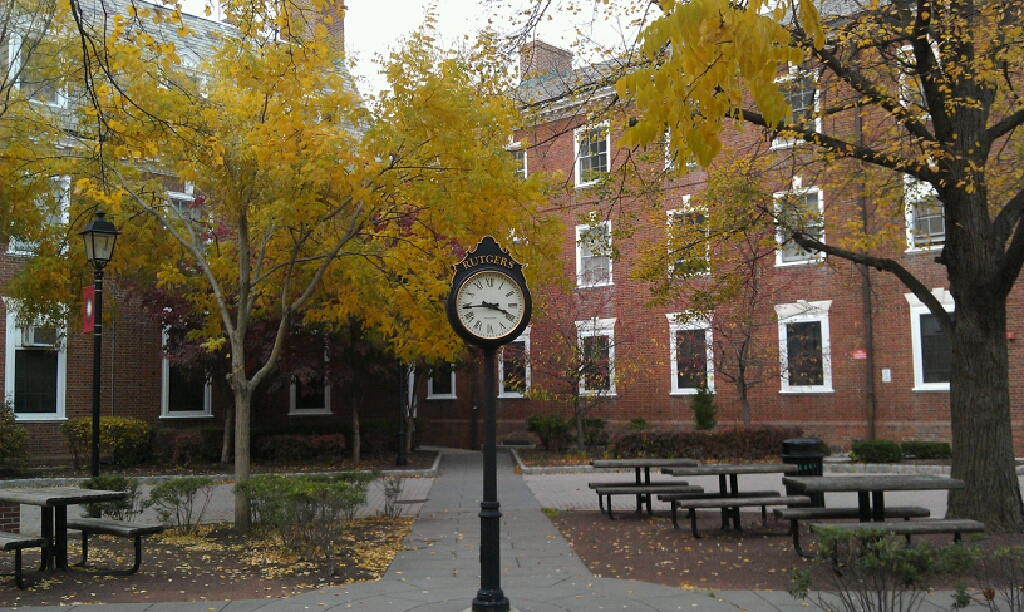
The Quad Clock on College Avenue campus

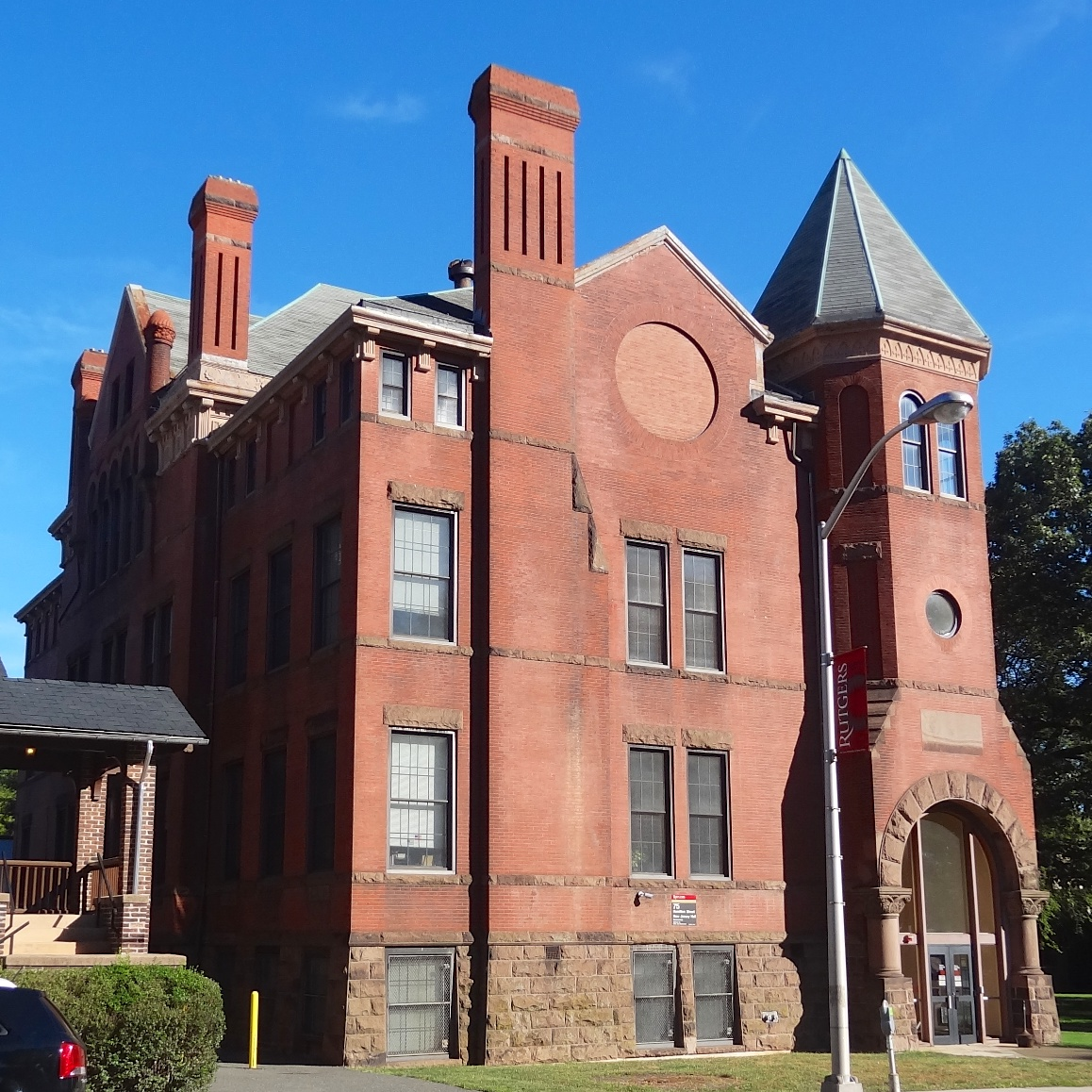
New Jersey Hall on the New Brunswick College Avenue Campus, which was the home of the Agricultural Experiment Station, Biology, and Chemistry faculty, now houses the university's Department of Economics.

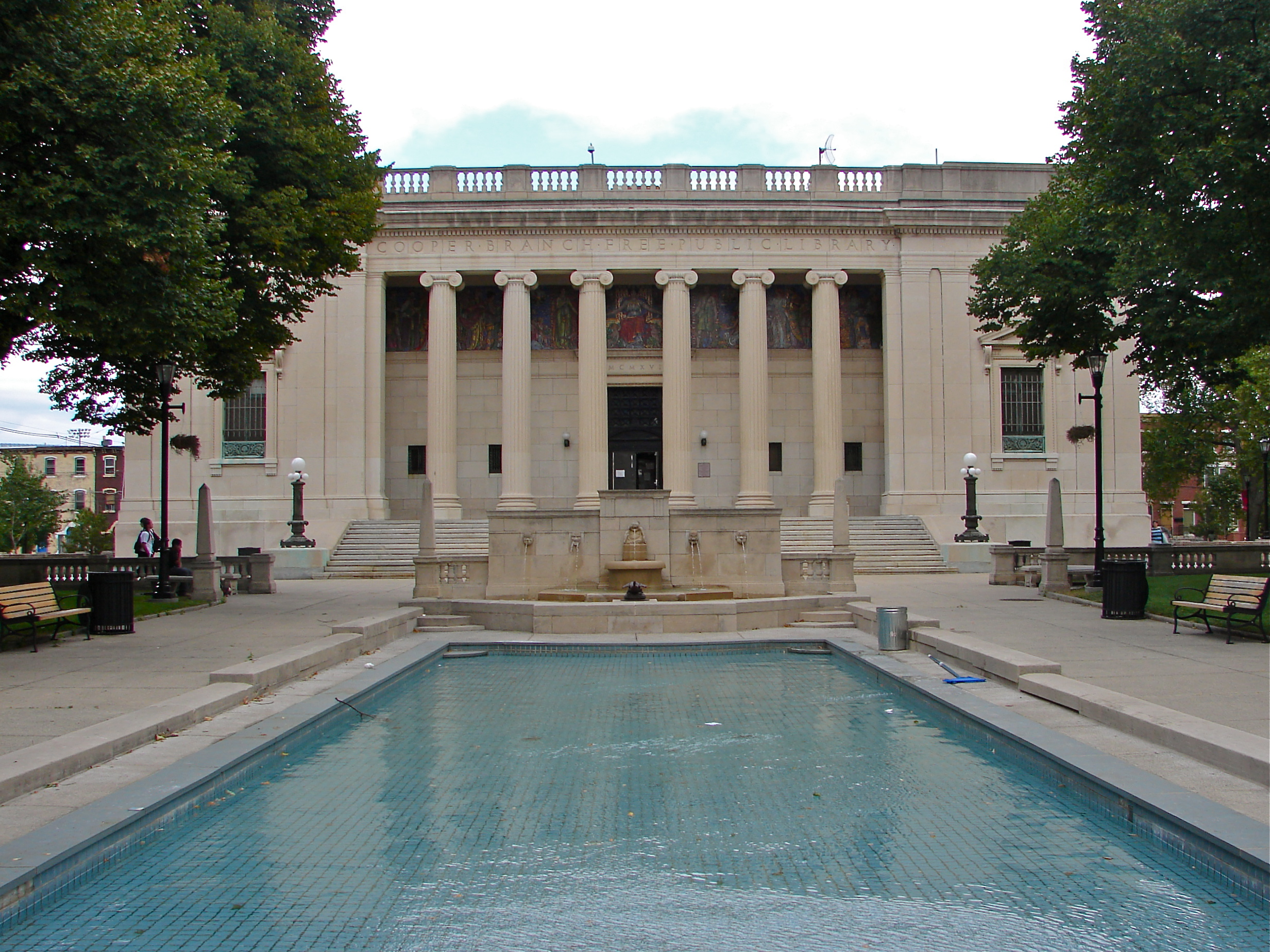
The Digital Studies Center and Johnson Park at Rutgers University–Camden

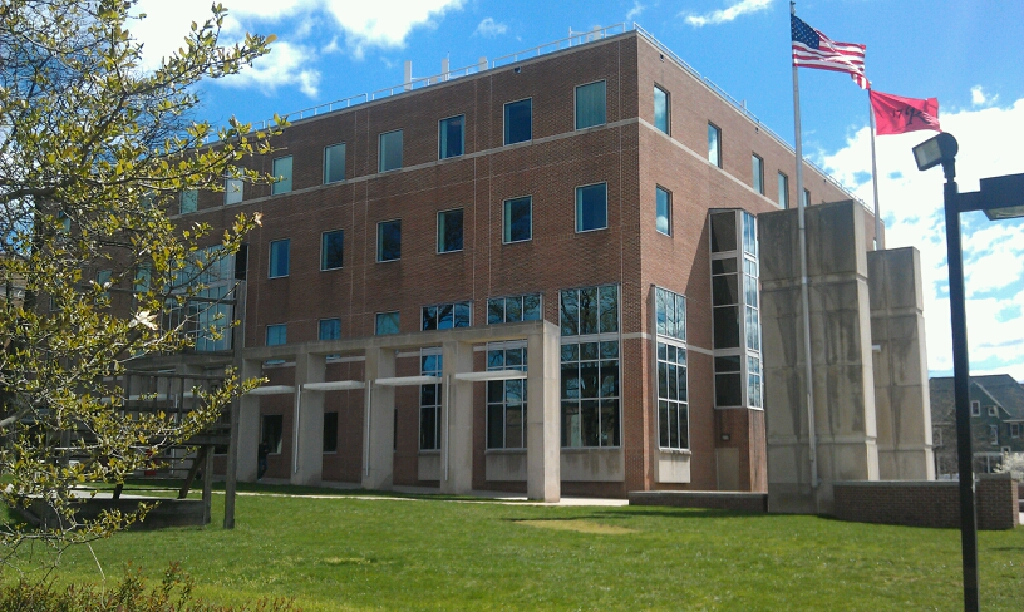
The Archibald S. Alexander Library is the main library at Rutgers University–New Brunswick.

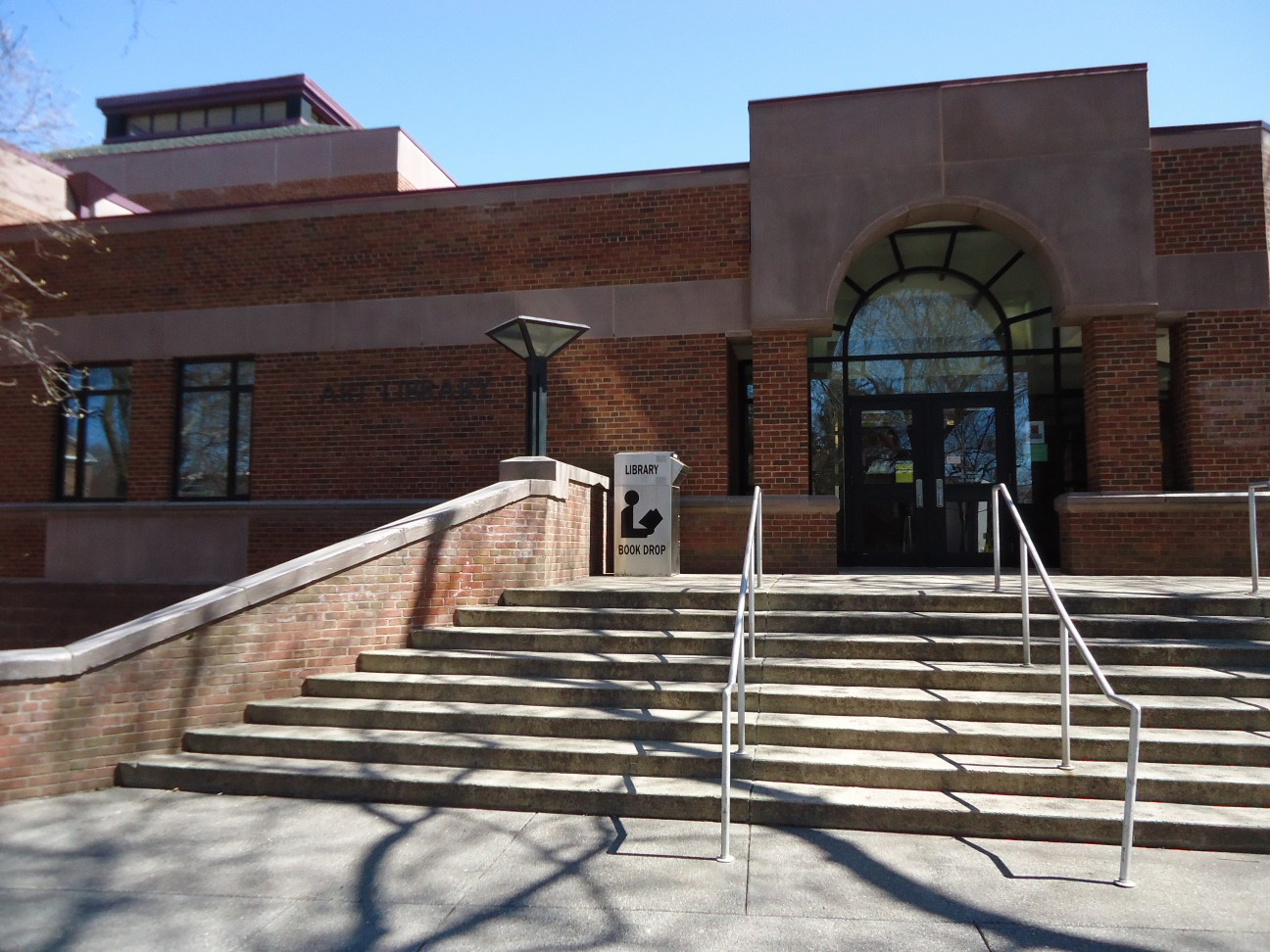
The art library on the College Avenue campus

The Rutgers University Libraries (RUL) system consists of twenty-six libraries, centers and reading rooms located on the university's four campuses. Housing a collection that includes 4,383,848 volumes (print and electronic), 4,605,896 microforms, and an array of electronic indexes and abstracts, full-text electronic journals, and research guides, Rutgers University Libraries ranks among the nation's top research libraries. The American Library Association ranks the Rutgers University Library system as the 44th-largest library in the United States in terms of volumes held.

The Archibald S. Alexander Library in New Brunswick, known to many students as "Club Alex", is the oldest and the largest library of the university, and houses an extensive humanities and social science collection. It also supports the work of faculty and staff at four professional schools: the Edward J. Bloustein School of Planning and Public Policy, the Graduate School of Education, the Graduate School of Social Work, and the School of Communication and Information. Alexander Library is also a Federal Depository Library, maintaining a large collection of government documents, which contains United States, New Jersey, foreign, and international government publications. The Paul Robeson Library in Camden, serves Rutgers affiliates as well as the Camden campuses of Rowan University and Camden County College with a broad collection of volumes, and also houses an archive including the papers of poet Nick Virgilio.

The Dana Library is the main research library for the Newark campus and is also home to the Institute of Jazz Studies, one of the world's largest collections of jazz archives and research. The Library of Science and Medicine (LSM) on the Busch Campus in Piscataway houses the university's collection in behavioral, biological, earth, and pharmaceutical sciences and engineering. LSM also serves as a designated depository library for government publications regarding science, and owns a U.S. patent collection and patent search facility. It was officially established as the Library of Science and Medicine in July 1964 although the beginning of the development of a library for science started in 1962. The current character of LSM is a university science library also serving a medical school.

On the New Brunswick-Piscataway campus, in addition to Alexander Library, many individual disciplines have their libraries, including art history, Chemistry, mathematics, music and physics. Special Collections and University Archives houses the Sinclair New Jersey Collection, manuscript collection, and rare book collection, as well as the university archives. Although located in the Alexander Library building, special collections and University Archives comprises a distinct unit unto itself. Also located within the Alexander Library is the East Asian Library, which holds a sizable collection of Chinese, Japanese, and Korean monographs and periodicals. There are nine major libraries at the Rutgers-New Brunswick location: the Alexander Library, Art Library, Carr Library, Chang Library, Douglass Library, Library of Science and Medicine, Math and Physics Library, School of Management and Labor Relations Library, and Special Collections & University Archives Library. Both the Newark and Camden campuses have law libraries.

In 2021, Alexander Library completed its Digital Learning Commons addition, expanding the library's footprint by over 16,000 sq ft into a multimedia center for the College Ave campus.

=== Museums and collections ===
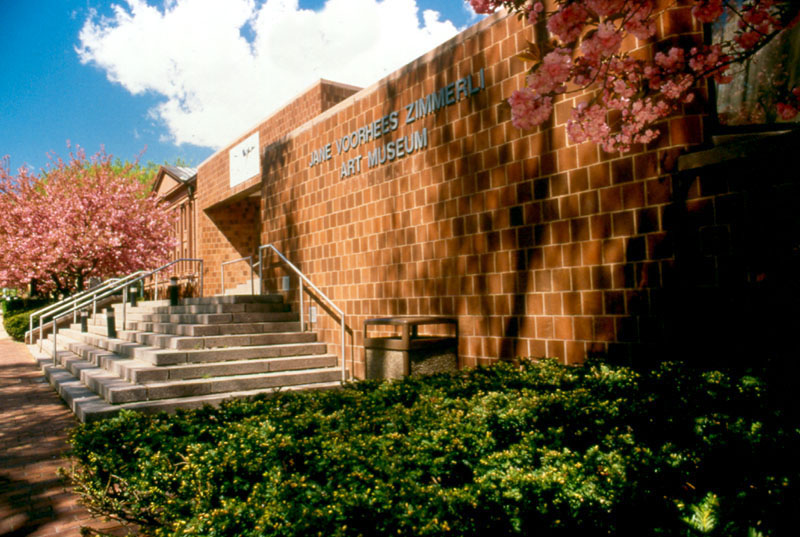
The Jane Voorhees Zimmerli Art Museum on Hamilton Street in New Brunswick

Rutgers oversees several museums and collections that are open to the public.

- Jane Voorhees Zimmerli Art Museum, on the College Avenue Campus maintains a collection of over 60,000 works of art, focusing on Russian and Soviet art, French 19th-century art and American 19th- and 20th-century art with a concentration on early 20th-century and contemporary prints.
- Rutgers University Geology Museum in Geology Hall features exhibits on geology and anthropology, with an emphasis on the natural history of New Jersey. The largest exhibits include a dinosaur trackway from Towaco, New Jersey; a mastodon from Salem County; and a Ptolemaic era Egyptian mummy.
- Rutgers Gardens, which features 50 acres (20 ha) of horticultural, display, and botanical gardens, as well as arboretums.
- Stedman Art Gallery on the Camden campus is a collection of local, national, and international artwork and exhibits as part of the Rutgers Camden Center for the Arts.
- Edison Papers is a collection of roughly 5 million documents related to Thomas Alva Edison. Nearly 175,000 of these documents are digitized and available to be viewed through their website.

Rutgers' facilities across the four campuses include a golf course, botanical gardens, working agricultural, horse, dairy, and sustainable farms, a creamery, an ecological preserve with multiple use trails, television and radio studios, theaters, museums, athletic facilities, helipads and a makerspace. The New Jersey Museum of Agriculture, established in 1984 in a 30,000-square-foot (2,800 m^{2}) facility in North Brunswick, closed in 2011.

== Research ==
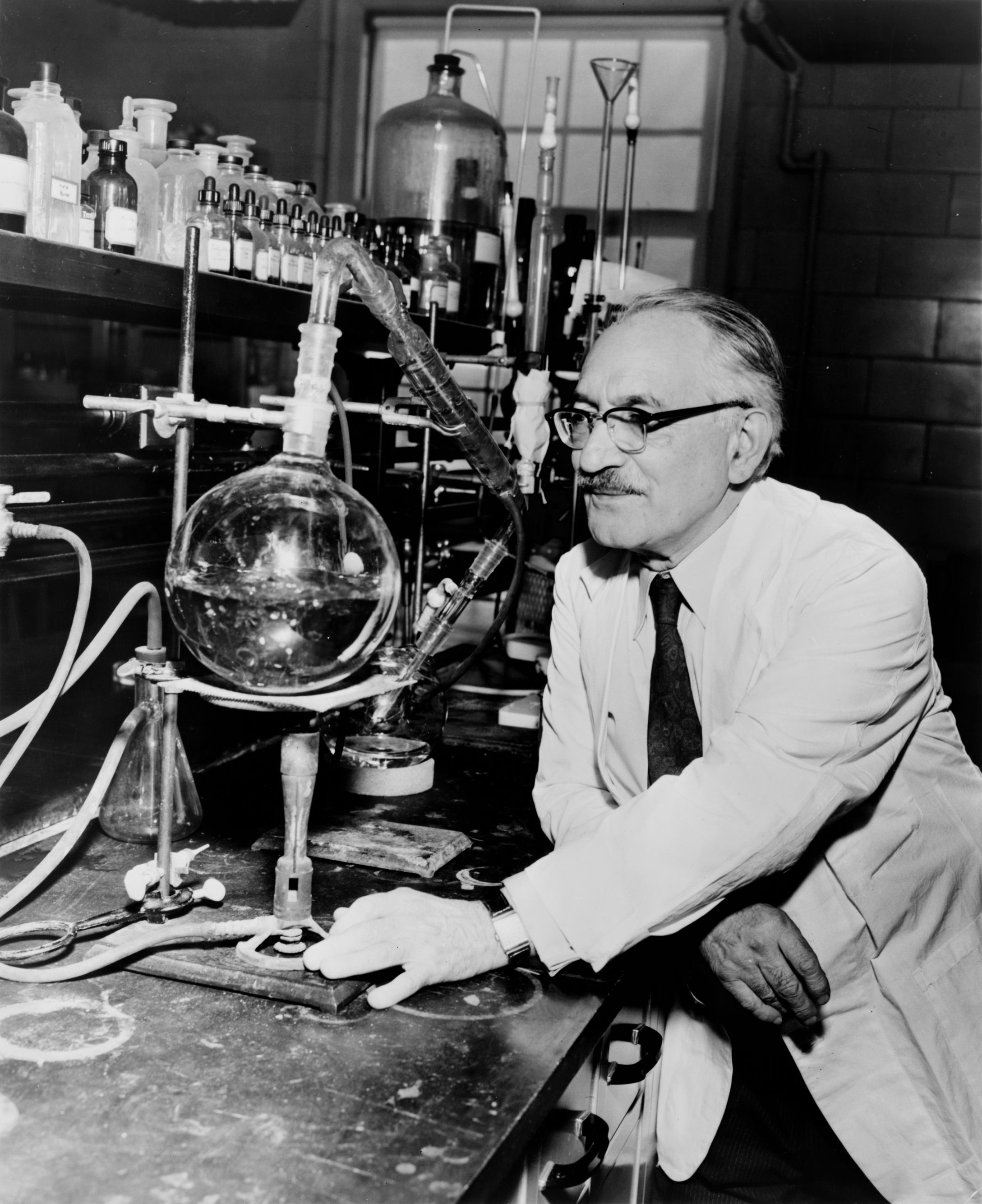
Prof. Selman A. Waksman (B.Sc. 1915), who was awarded the Nobel Prize in Medicine for developing 22 antibiotics, including Streptomycin, in his Rutgers University laboratory

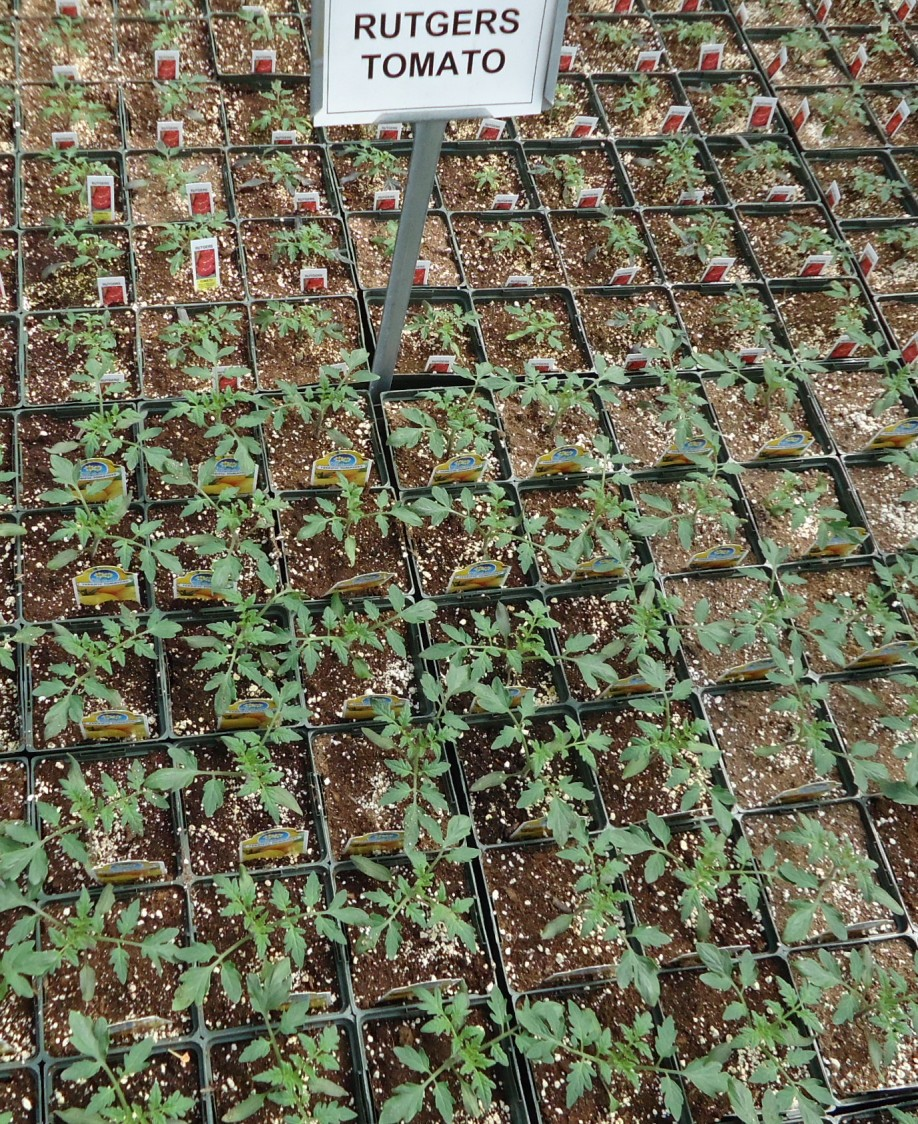
A Rutgers tomato growing at a New Jersey greenhouse

Rutgers is home to the Rutgers University Center for Cognitive Science, also known as RUCCS. This research center hosts researchers in psychology, linguistics, computer science, philosophy, electrical engineering, and anthropology.

It was at Rutgers that Selman Waksman discovered several antibiotics, including actinomycin, clavacin, streptothricin, grisein, neomycin, fradicin, candicidin, candidin, and others. Waksman, along with graduate student Albert Schatz, discovered streptomycin—a versatile antibiotic that was to be the first applied to cure tuberculosis. For this discovery, Waksman received the Nobel Prize for Medicine in 1952.

Rutgers developed water-soluble sustained release polymers, tetraploids, robotic hands, artificial bovine insemination, and the ceramic tiles for the heat shield on the Space Shuttle. In health-related field, Rutgers has the Environmental & Occupational Health Science Institute (EOHSI).

Rutgers is also home to the RCSB Protein Data bank, 'an information portal to Biological Macromolecular Structures' cohosted with the San Diego Supercomputer Center. This database is the authoritative research tool for bioinformaticists using protein primary, secondary and tertiary structures worldwide.'

Rutgers is home to the Rutgers Cooperative Research & Extension office, which is run by the Agricultural and Experiment Station with the support of the local government. The institution provides research & education to the local farming and agro-industrial community in 19 of the 21 counties of the state and educational outreach programs offered through the New Jersey Agricultural Experiment Station Office of Continuing Professional Education.

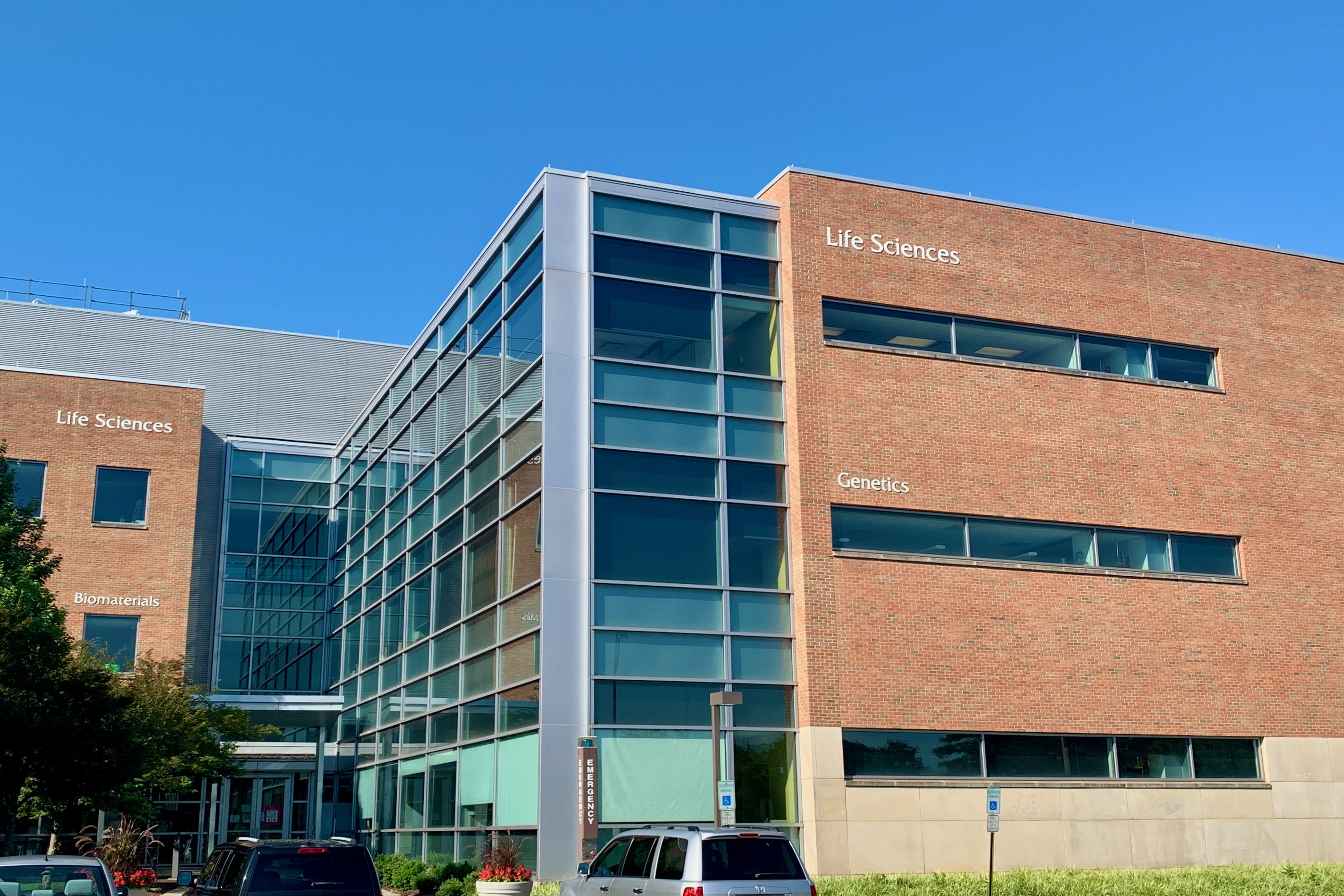
The Life Sciences and Genetics Building

Rutgers University Cell and DNA Repository (RUCDR) is the largest university-based repository in the world and has received awards worth more than $57.8 million from the National Institutes of Health (NIH). One will fund genetic studies of mental disorders and the other will support investigations into the causes of digestive, liver, and kidney diseases, and diabetes.

== Student life ==
The student body at Rutgers University is highly diverse, with students representing over 100 countries and numerous cultural backgrounds.

Undergraduate demographics as of fall 2023
Race and ethnicity	Total
White	31%
Asian	26%
Hispanic	18%
Black	10%
International student	9%
Two or more races	3%
Other	3%
Economic diversity
Low-income (Note: The percentage of students who received an income-based federal Pell grant intended for low-income students.)	28%
Affluent (Note: The percentage of students who are a part of the American middle class at the bare minimum.)	72%

=== Residential life ===
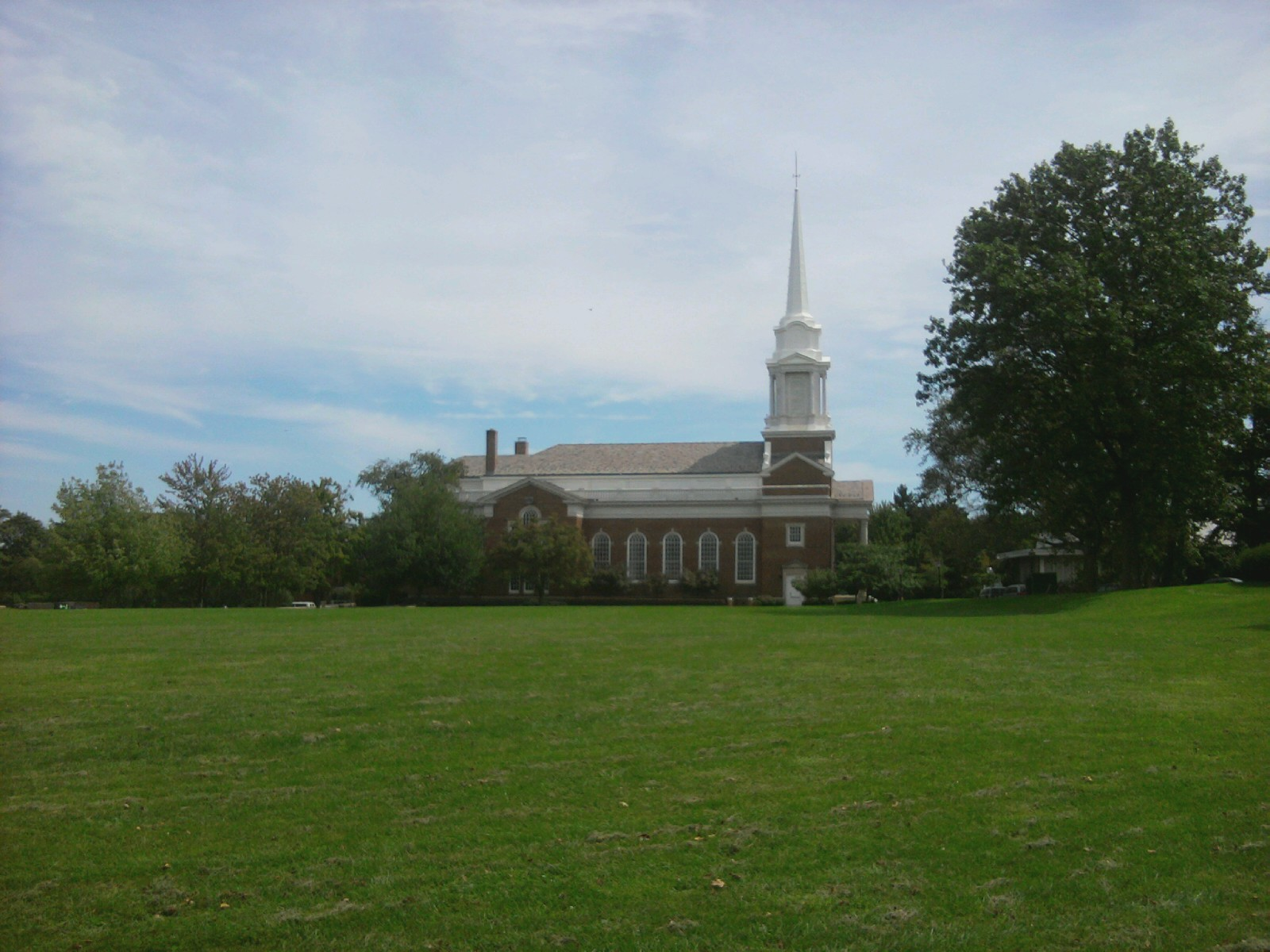
The Voorhees Chapel is a notable landmark on the Douglass campus at Rutgers; Douglass was founded as an all-women's college in 1918, but now houses co-ed dormitories.

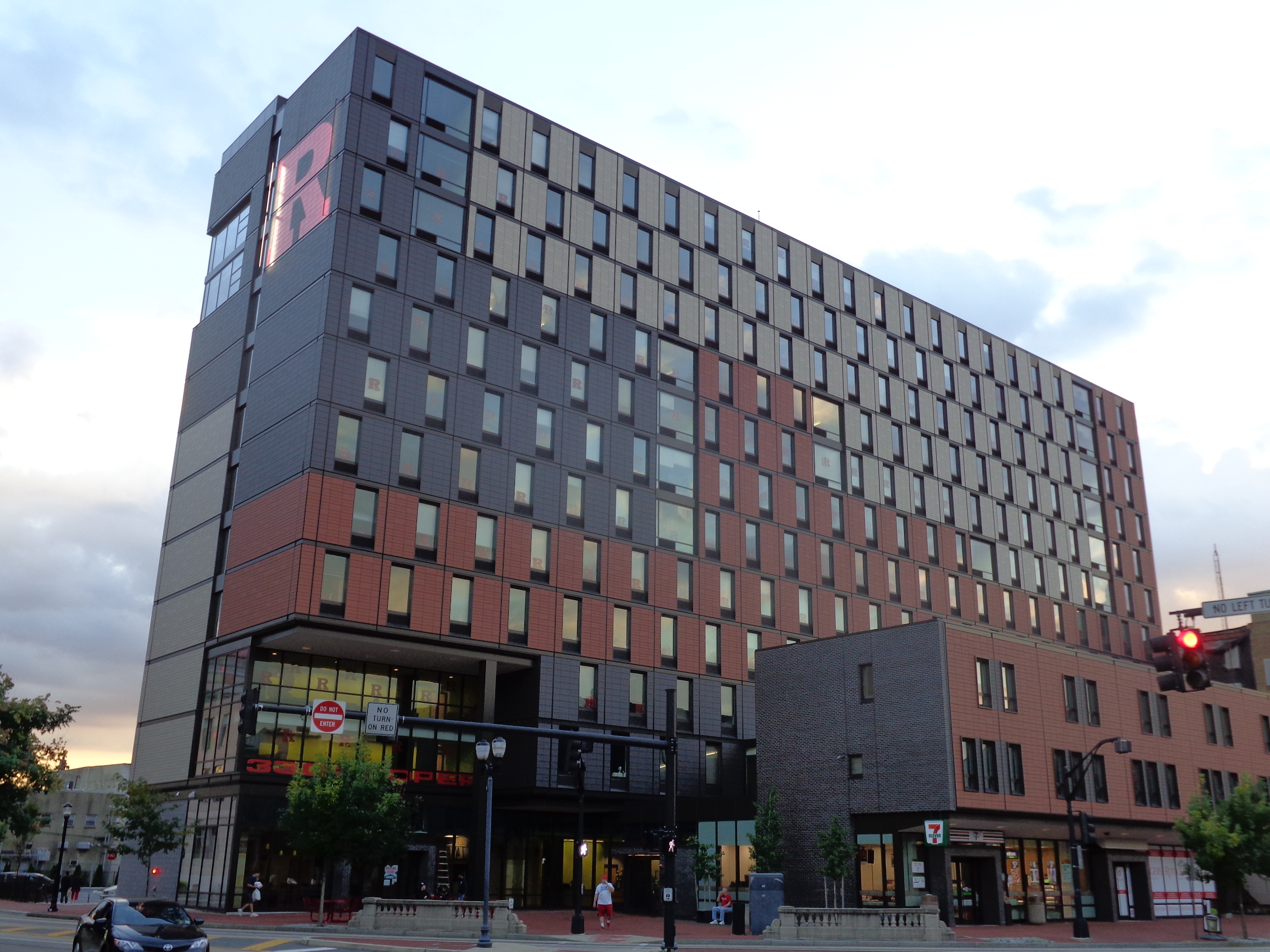
330 Cooper student housing on the Camden campus

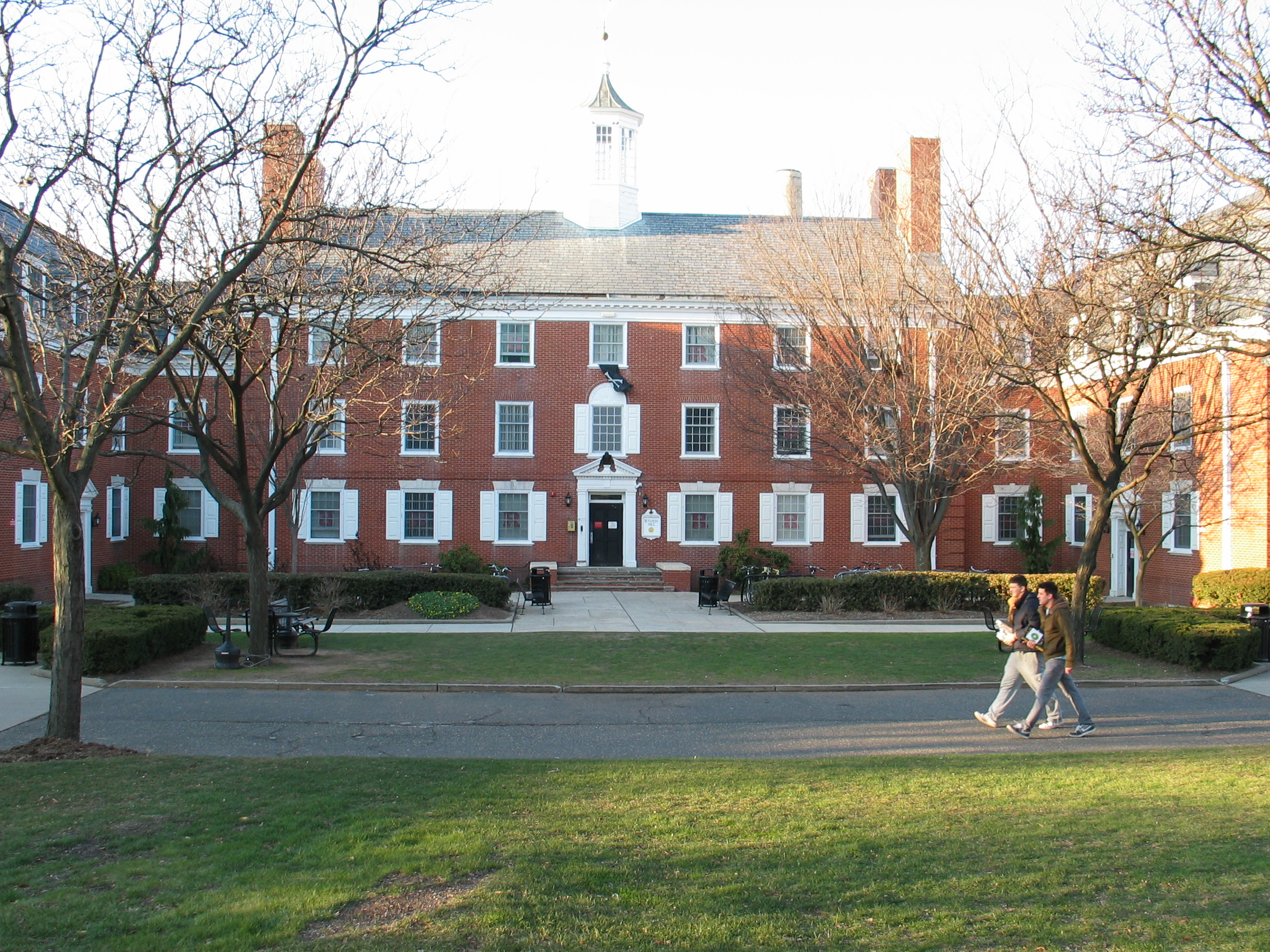
Demarest Hall dormitory on the New Brunswick campus

Rutgers University offers a variety of housing options. On the New Brunswick-Piscataway campus, students are given the option of on-campus housing in both traditional dorms or apartments. Freshman students, however, are allowed only a dorm, while upperclassmen have a wider array of on-campus housing choices, like apartments, but must apply for on-campus housing through the Rutgers online lottery process. Most students seeking on-campus housing will be accommodated with a space and sophomores are guaranteed housing. Many Rutgers students opt to rent apartments or houses off-campus within the city of New Brunswick. Similar setups are to be found in Rutgers–Newark and Rutgers–Camden.

In 2008, U.S. News & World Report ranked Rutgers University–Newark the most diverse university campus in the United States. Because the area of Rutgers' New Brunswick-Piscataway campus—which is composed of several constituent colleges and professional schools—is sprawled across six municipalities, the individual campuses are connected by an inter-campus bus system. The Rutgers bus system is the second-largest bus service in New Jersey, transporting six million passengers on an annual basis.

=== Security and emergency services ===
Services provided by the university include Rutgers Police, Emergency Medical Services, an emergency management office, bus and shuttle service, inter- and intra-campus mail, and occupational and environmental health and safety.

=== Student organizations and activities ===
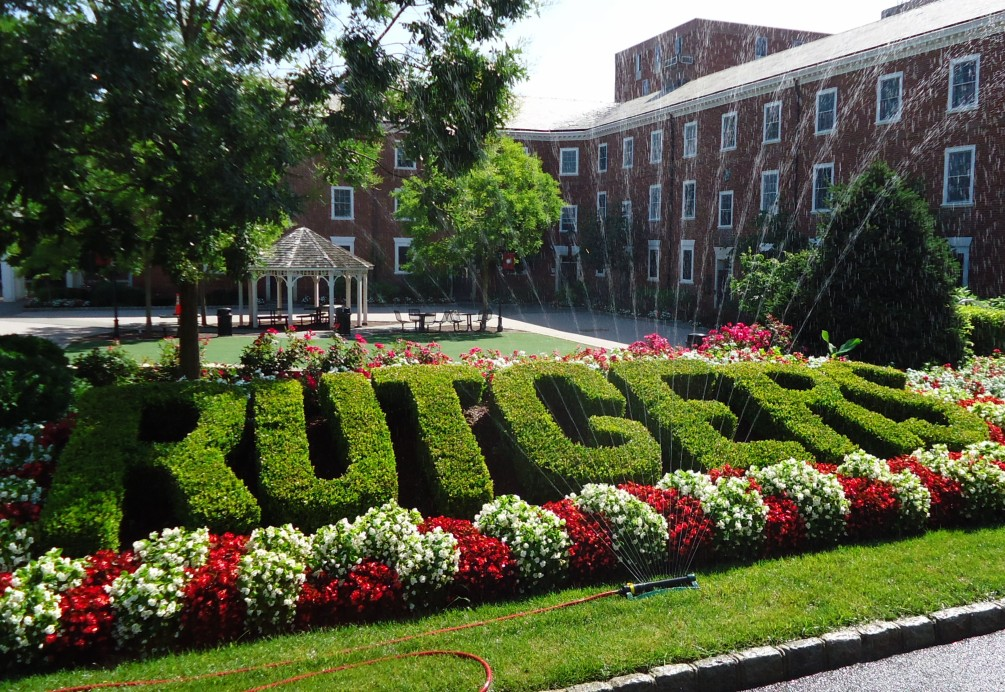
Shrubbery at the College Avenue campus

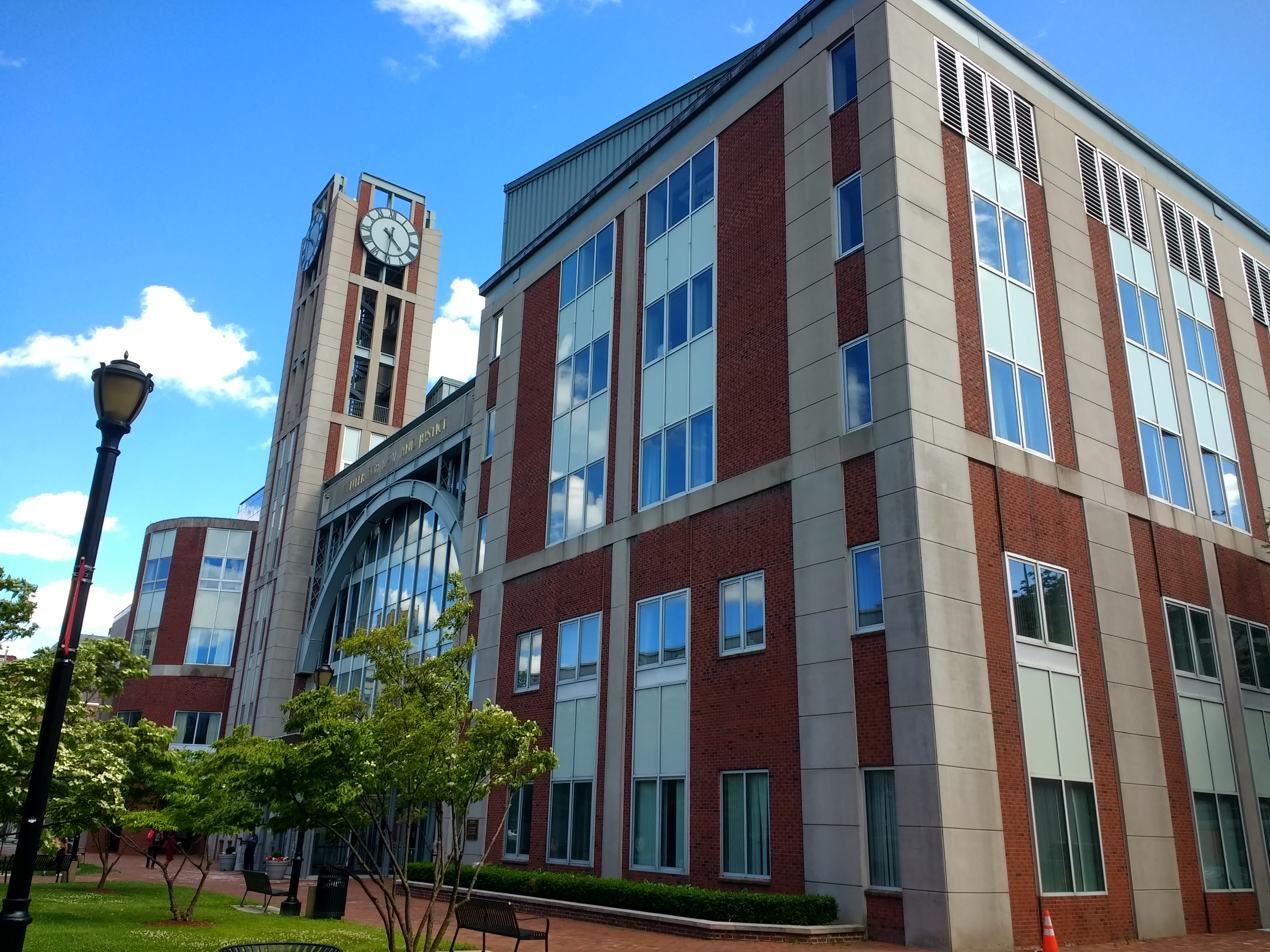
Rutgers Law School on the Newark Campus

Rutgers University has a student government that controls funding to student groups. The student government is made up of campus councils and professional school councils. Those councils then send representatives to the student assembly as well as the university senate. An example of these campus councils is the University College Council, which represents adult, part-time, and military veteran students.

Rutgers hosts over 700 student organizations; among the first student groups was the first college newspaper in the United States. The Political Intelligencer and New Jersey Adviser began publication at Queen's College in 1783, and ceased operation in 1785. Continuing this tradition is the university's current college newspaper, The Daily Targum, established in 1869, which is the second-oldest college newspaper published in the United States, after The Dartmouth (1843). Both poet Joyce Kilmer and economist Milton Friedman served as editors. Also included are The Medium, a weekly satirical newspaper billed as Rutgers Entertainment Weekly, Rutgers Centurion, a conservative newspaper, the Rutgers University Glee Club, a male choral singing group established in 1872 (among the oldest in the country). Rutgers a cappella groups have routinely placed well in the International Championship of Collegiate A Cappella, including in 2010 when The OrphanSporks placed second in the semifinals. Governed by the Rutgers University Student Assembly and funded by student fees, students can organize groups for practically any political ideology or issue, ethnic or religious affiliation, academic subject, activity or hobby.

Rutgers University is home to chapters of many Greek organizations, and a significant percentage of the undergraduate student body is active in Greek life. Several fraternities and sororities maintain houses for their chapters in the area of Union Street (known familiarly as "Frat Row") in New Brunswick, within blocks of Rutgers' College Avenue Campus. Chapters of Zeta Psi and Delta Phi were organized at Rutgers as early as 1845. The Alpha Rho chapter of Chi Psi fraternity, founded at Rutgers College in 1879, was the first fraternity at Rutgers to own a fraternity house, purchased in 1887 and still in use by the fraternity today. There are over fifty fraternities and sororities on the New Brunswick-Piscataway campus, ranging from traditional to historically African-American, Hispanic, Multicultural, and Asian interest organizations. The New Brunswick campus of Rutgers University has a chapter of the only active co-ed pre-medical fraternity, Phi Delta Epsilon, as of 2008. The Rutgers chapter of Alpha Sigma Phi was closed in October 2025 after a student was left unconscious by a hazing ritual.

It is Rutgers's tradition for students to participate in one of the largest student-run philanthropic events in New Jersey, the Embrace Kids Foundation for children with cancer and blood disorders. The annual Dance Marathon involves hundreds of dancers and volunteers. In 2015, the marathon collected $692,046.

Rutgers has five vocal ensembles: Voorhees Choir (the New Brunswick campus's women's ensemble), Kirkpatrick Choir (the university's most selective coed ensemble), Glee Club (New Brunswick's most esteemed tenor-bass ensemble), University Choir (a larger mixed choir in New Brunswick), and the Rutgers Concert Choir (Camden's vocal ensemble of faculty and students).

=== Traditions ===
The Grease Trucks are a group of truck-based food vendors located at various locations on the New Brunswick campus. They serve traditional grill fare and Middle-Eastern specialties. Three Rutgers Grease Trucks remain on the College Avenue Campus, while the remaining two were moved to the Cook/Douglass Campus.

The Dance Marathon is a student-run fundraiser. Hundreds of dancers pledge to raise funds and remain standing for 32 hours. Rutgers has held this tradition since 1999, and has raised more than $1.3 million for the Embrace Kids Foundation and for other charities. In the two decades starting in 1998, the event raised $5.8 million for the Embrace Kids Foundation.

Rutgers Day is an annual festival established in 1906.

=== Mottos, colors and mascots ===
Rutgers University's motto Sol iustitiae et occidentem illustra is a modification of Utrecht University's motto Sol iustitiae illustra nos gleaned from a literal Latin Bible translation of Malachi 4:2 and highlights the historic connection of these two universities.

Rutgers University's only school color is scarlet. Students had sought to make orange the school color, citing Rutgers' Dutch heritage and about the Prince of Orange. The Rutgers student publication Targum (which would become the Daily Targum) proposed that scarlet be adopted in May 1869, claiming that it was a striking color and because the scarlet ribbon was easily obtained. During the first intercollegiate football game with Princeton on November 6, 1869, the players from Rutgers wore scarlet-colored turbans and handkerchiefs to distinguish them as a team from the Princeton players. The board of trustees officially made scarlet the school color in 1900.

In its early days, Rutgers athletes were known informally as "The Scarlet" after the school color, or as "Queensmen" after the institution's first name, Queen's College. In 1925, the mascot was changed to Chanticleer, a fighting rooster from the medieval fable Reynard the Fox (Le Roman de Renart) which was used by Geoffrey Chaucer in the Canterbury Tales. At the time, the student humor magazine at Rutgers was called Chanticleer, and one of its early arts editors, Ozzie Nelson (later of The Adventures of Ozzie and Harriet fame) was quarterback of the Rutgers team from 1924 to 1926. The Chanticleer mascot was unveiled at a football game against Lafayette College, in which Lafayette was also introducing a new mascot, a leopard. However, the choice of Chanticleer as a mascot was often the subject of ridicule because of its association with "being chicken." In 1955, the mascot was changed to the Scarlet Knight after a campus-wide election, beating out other contenders such as "Queensmen," the "Scarlet," the "Red Lions," the "Redmen" and the "Flying Dutchmen." Earlier proposed nicknames included "Pioneers" and "Cannoneers." When Harvey Harman, then coach of the football team was asked why he supported changing the Rutgers mascot, he was quoted as saying, "Awnish You can call it the Chanticleer, you can call it a fighting cock, you can call it any damn thing you want, but everybody knows it's a chicken." Harman later is said to have bought the first "Scarlet Knight" mascot costume for the 1955 season, which was to be his final season as football coach at Rutgers. Today, the Scarlet Knight costumed mascot appearing at Rutgers football and basketball games and other campus events is called "Sir Henry". The mascot's name serves as a direct nod to Colonel Henry Rutgers, the Revolutionary War veteran and philanthropist whose foundational endowment led to the university being named in his honor.

In later years the Camden and Newark campuses adopted their mascots, the Scarlet Raptor (Camden) and the Scarlet Raider (Newark).

== Athletics ==
The Rutgers "R" logo debuted in 1998 and has represented the school in athletics since.

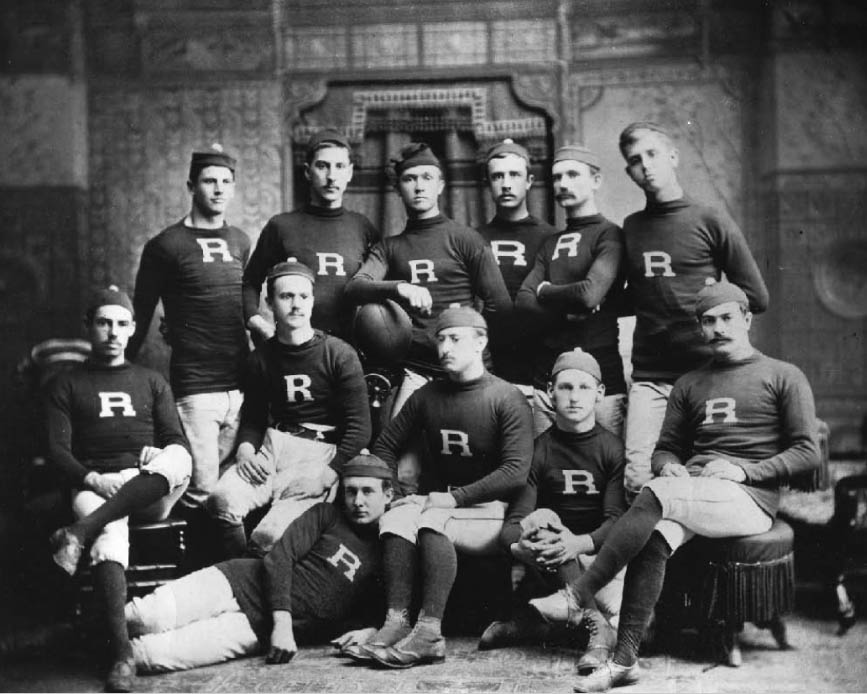
The Rutgers college football team in 1882

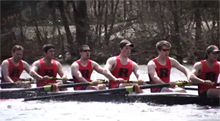
The Rutgers-New Brunswick men's varsity eight rowing on the Raritan River

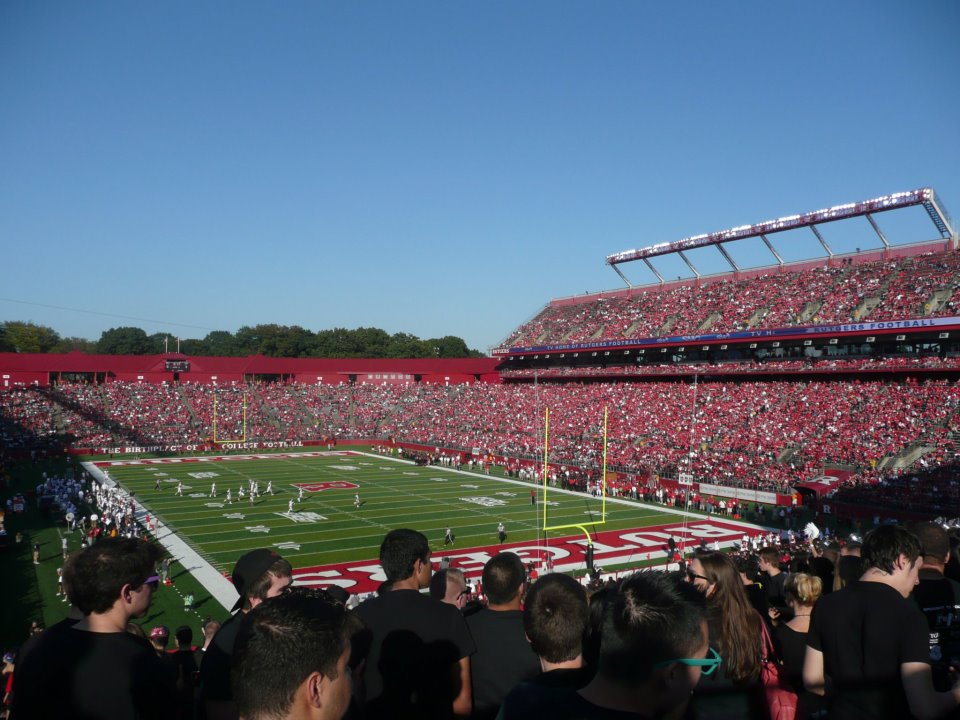
SHI Stadium, the home field of Scarlet Knights football

The Rutgers–Camden athletic teams are called the Scarlet Raptors. The Rutgers–Newark athletic teams are called the Scarlet Raiders. The Scarlet Raiders and the Scarlet Raptors both compete within NCAA Division III.

Rutgers was among the first American institutions to engage in intercollegiate athletics, and participated in a small circle of schools that included Yale University, Columbia University, and long-time rival, Princeton University (then called the College of New Jersey). The four schools met at the Fifth Avenue Hotel in Manhattan on October 19, 1873, to establish a set of rules governing their intercollegiate competition, and particularly to codify the new game of football. Although invited, Harvard chose not to attend. In the early years of intercollegiate athletics, the schools that participated in these athletic events were located solely in the American Northeast and by the turn of the 20th century, colleges and universities across the United States began to participate.

Rutgers University is referred to as "the birthplace of college football" as the first intercollegiate football game was held on College Field between Rutgers and Princeton on November 6, 1869, in New Brunswick, New Jersey, on a plot of ground behind where the present-day College Avenue Gymnasium now stands. Rutgers won the game, with a score of 6 runs to Princeton's 4. A Rutgers-Princeton rivalry still exists today. According to Parke H. Davis, the 1869 Rutgers football team shared the national title with Princeton. (This game is believed to have been closer to soccer than to modern American football.)

In 1864, rowing became the first organized sport at Rutgers. Six-mile races were held on the Raritan River among six-oared boats. In 1870, Rutgers held its first intercollegiate competition, against the Lawrence Scientific School of Harvard, the then top-ranked amateur crew of the time. Women's crew was added to the program in 1974. Financial support of the men's crew program was discontinued by the university in 2006, though the crew continues to compete (funded entirely by alumni and private support) at a high level in the Eastern Association of Rowing Colleges conference.

The first intercollegiate athletic event at Rutgers was a baseball game on May 2, 1866, against Princeton in which they suffered a 40–2 loss.

Beginning in 1866, Rutgers was unaffiliated with any formal athletic conference and thus classified as "independent" for eighty years. From 1946 to 1951, the university was a member of the Middle Three Conference, and from 1958 to 1961, was a member of the Middle Atlantic Conference. In 1978, the Rutgers Scarlet Knights became a member of the Atlantic 10 conference. In 1991, it joined the Big East Conference for football. All sports programs at Rutgers New Brunswick subsequently became affiliated with the Big East in 1995.

The first intercollegiate competition in Ultimate Frisbee was held between students from Rutgers and Princeton on November 6, 1972, to mark the one hundred third anniversary of the first intercollegiate football game. Rutgers won 29–27. The Rutgers Scarlet Knights men's Basketball Team was among the "Final Four" and ended the 1976 season ranked fourth in the United States, after an 86–70 loss against the University of Michigan in the semifinals, and a 106–92 loss against UCLA in the consolation round of the 1976 NCAA Men's Division I Basketball Tournament.

The Rutgers Scarlet Knights are members of the Big Ten Conference, a collegiate athletic conference consisting of 14 colleges and universities from the Midwestern and East Coast regions of the United States. The Big Ten Conference is a member of the Bowl Championship Series. Rutgers currently fields 27 intercollegiate sports programs and is a Division I school as sanctioned by the National Collegiate Athletic Association. Rutgers fields thirty teams in NCAA Division I sanctioned sports, including football, baseball, basketball, crew, cross country, fencing, field hockey, golf, gymnastics, lacrosse, soccer, softball, tennis, track and field, swimming and diving, wrestling, and volleyball.

The Scarlet Knights have won five Big East Conference tournament titles: men's soccer (1997), men's track & field (2005), baseball (2000, 2007), and women's basketball (2007). Several other teams have won regular season titles but failed to win the conference's championship tournament.

Although the Rutgers Scarlet Knights' football team had losing seasons in 2016 and 2015 (won-lost records of 2–10 and 4–8, respectively) it achieved success previously, being invited to the Insight Bowl on December 27, 2005, in which they lost 45 to 40 against Arizona State University. This was Rutgers' first bowl appearance since the December 16, 1978, loss against Arizona State, 34–18, at the Garden State Bowl. The 2006 football season also saw Rutgers being ranked within the Top 25 teams in major college football polls. After the November 9, 2006, victory over the 3rd ranked, undefeated Louisville Cardinals, Rutgers jumped up to seventh in the AP Poll, eighth in the USA Today/Coaches poll, seventh in the Harris Interactive Poll, and sixth in the Bowl Championship Series rankings. These were Rutgers' highest rankings in the football polls since they were ranked fifteenth in 1961. Rutgers ended the season 11–2 after winning the inaugural Texas Bowl on December 28, 2006, defeating the Wildcats of Kansas State University by a score of 37–10 and finishing the season ranked twelfth in the final AP poll of sportswriters, the team's highest season-ending ranking.

Under Head Coach C. Vivian Stringer, the women's basketball program is among the elite programs in the country as they remain consistently ranked in the Top 25, consistently making the NCAA Women's Championship Tournament, and sometimes winning the Big East regular season championship. In 2006–2007, the Scarlet Knights won their first-ever Big East Conference Tournament Championship. The program has been highly competitive since its inception, winning the 1982 AIAW National Championship, reaching the 2000 Final Four, and reaching the Final Four and national championship game in 2007.

The Scarlet Knights maintain athletic rivalries with other collegiate institutions. The university has historic rivalries with Princeton University, Columbia University (formerly King's College), Lafayette College, Lehigh University, and New York University originating from the early days of college football. While they maintain this rivalry in other sports, neither of them has met in football since 1980. Rutgers has a basketball rivalry with Seton Hall University. Penn State and the University of Maryland are the two schools with which Rutgers was developing rivalries within the Big Ten.

In the fall of 2007, six Rutgers New Brunswick/Piscataway NCAA Division I sports were discontinued by the university, including men's swimming and diving, men's heavyweight and lightweight crew, men's tennis, and men's and women's fencing. Some continued as club teams, while some were disbanded completely. The university claims this change was due to budget cuts, while others claim it was a politically motivated move designed to protest state funding changes.

In November 2012, the Rutgers Scarlet Knights, along with Louisville, Connecticut, and Cincinnati left the Big East to form the American Athletic Conference. Syracuse and Pittsburgh have decided to enter the Atlantic Coast Conference, while West Virginia entered the Big 12 Conference, taking effect as of the 2012–2013 season. Rutgers decided to leave American for the Big Ten Conference, effective July 1, 2014. Rutgers surpassed Penn State as the Big Ten's easternmost school.

On March 23, 2019, Nick Suriano and Anthony Ashnault won national titles for Rutgers wrestling and provided Rutgers with their first two NCAA wrestling championships.

In 2021, the Rutgers men's basketball team was selected to participate in the NCAA tournament. This marked the program's first appearance in the tournament since 1991 and ending a 30-year-long streak that made the school the longest to have been excluded among major collegiate basketball programs.

In 2022, Rutgers men's lacrosse team was selected to participate in the NCAA Division I tournament. They defeated Harvard and the University of Pennsylvania to reach their first-ever Final Four. Their season ended with a 17–10 loss to Cornell. In 2025, the women's rowing eight won the Island Challenge Cup at the Henley Royal Regatta.

== Notable people ==
=== Alumni ===
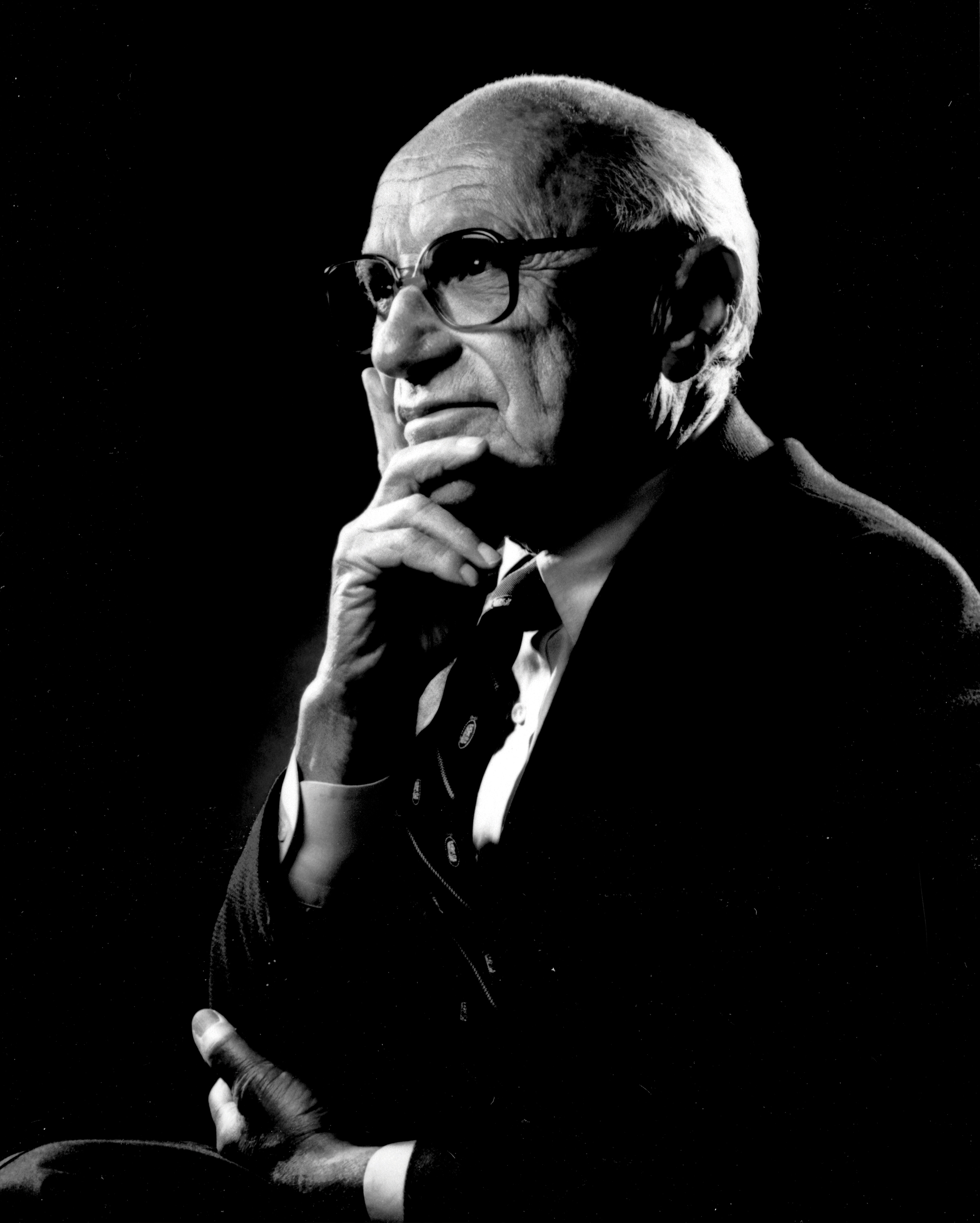
Milton Friedman received his B.A. from Rutgers-New Brunswick in 1932.

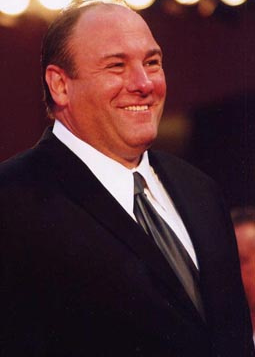
James Gandolfini, star of HBO's The Sopranos, received his B.A. from Rutgers-New Brunswick in 1983.

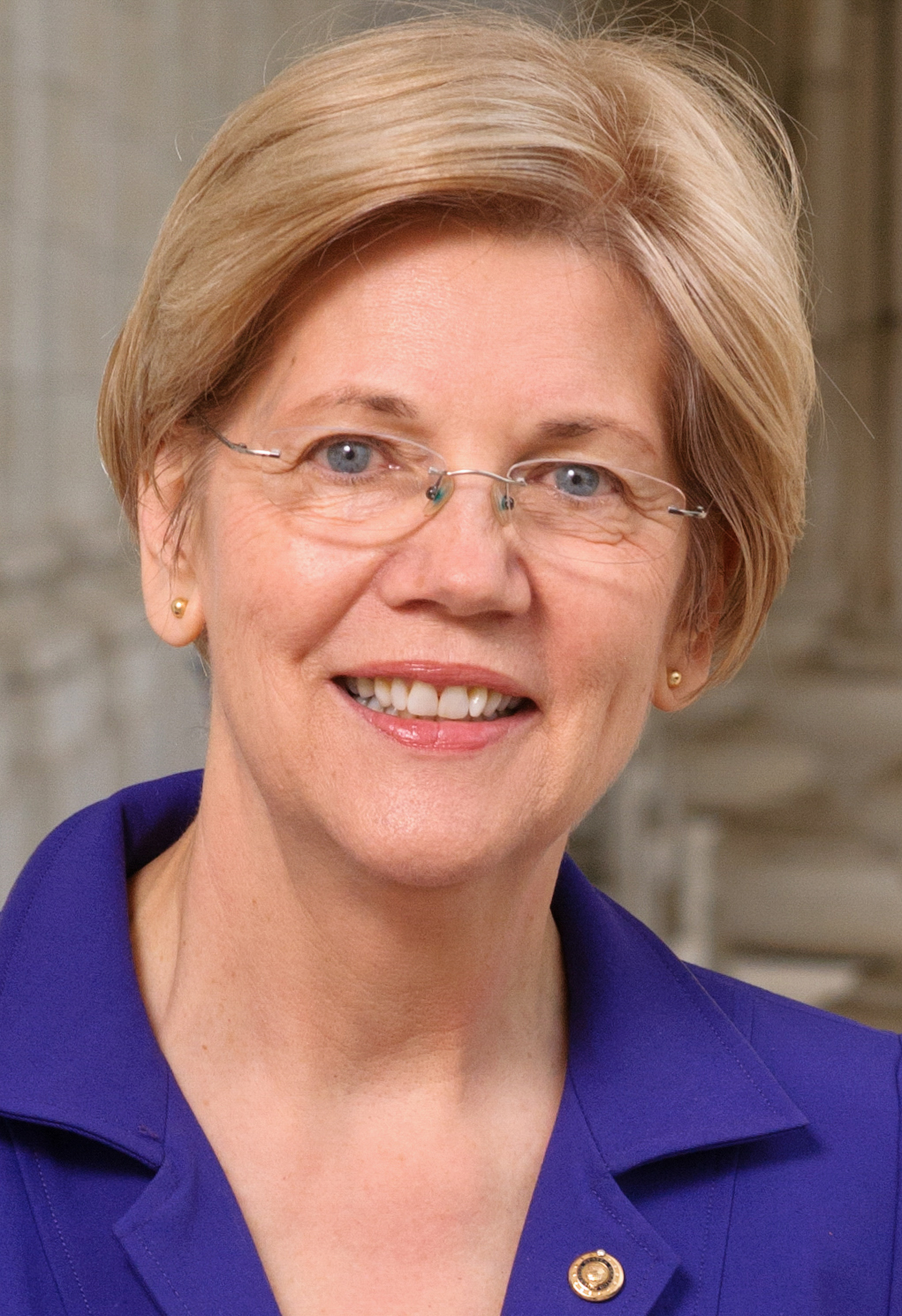
Senator Elizabeth Warren received her JD from Rutgers Law School in 1976.

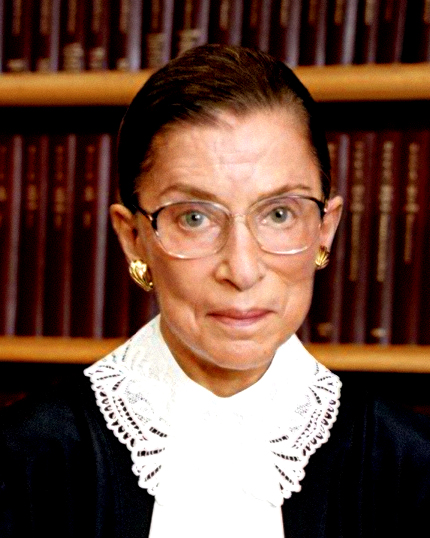
U.S. Supreme Court Justice Ruth Bader Ginsburg served as a law professor at Rutgers Law School from 1963 to 1972.

At Queen's College's first commencement in 1774, one graduate, Matthew Leydt, received his baccalaureate degree in a brief ceremony.

Rutgers alumni have been influential in many fields. Singer, athlete, attorney, and Civil Rights Movement activist Paul Robeson graduated in 1919 and is the namesake of the Paul Robeson Cultural Center on the Busch Campus, the Paul Robeson Library on the Camden Campus, and the Campus Center on the Newark Campus. Among the first students enrolled at Rutgers (when it was Queen's College), Simeon De Witt (A.B. 1776) became the surveyor-general for the Continental Army (1776–1783) during the American Revolution and classmate James Schureman (A.B. 1775), served in the Continental Congress and as a United States senator. Two alumni have been awarded Nobel prizes — Milton Friedman (A.B. 1932) in economics, and Selman A. Waksman (B.Sc. 1915, M.Sc.1916) in Medicine. Poet Robert Pinsky (B.A. 1962) was appointed the nation's poet laureate and novelist Junot Díaz (B.A. 1992) was awarded the Pulitzer Prize for Fiction in 2008.

Seven alumni have served as New Jersey governor; (Note: These seven include Charles C. Stratton (A.B. 1814), William A. Newell (A.B. 1836; A.M. 1839), George C. Ludlow (A.B. 1850, A.M. 1850), Foster M. Voorhees (A.B. 1876, A.M. 1879), A. Harry Moore (J.D. 1922), Richard Hughes (J.D. 1931), and James J. Florio (J.D. 1967).) two as president of Rutgers; (Note: These two are William Henry Steele Demarest (A.B. 1883), who served as president 1906–24; and Philip Milledoler Brett (A.B. 1892), who served as acting president 1930–31. See List of Rutgers University presidents.) Garret A. Hobart (A.B. 1863) as vice president of the United States; Louis Freeh (B.A. 1971, J.D. 1974) as director of the FBI; and Frederick T. Frelinghuysen (A.B. 1836) as U.S. senator and U.S. secretary of state. Alumnus Joseph P. Bradley (A.B. 1836) served for two decades as an associate justice of the Supreme Court of the United States and cast the tie-breaking vote on the bipartisan commission that decided the contested American presidential election in 1876. Diplomat Maria Fernanda Espinosa served as president of the United Nations General Assembly. Senators Elizabeth Warren (JD 1976) and Bob Menendez (JD 1979) both attended Rutgers Law School. Some alumni became activists, such as Jack Babuscio (MHist.).

In business, alumni include Bernard Marcus (B.S. 1951), founder of hardware retail company Home Depot; Bill Rasmussen (MBA 1960), founder of ESPN; Rana Kapoor, founder of Yes Bank; Dev Ittycheria (B.S 1990), CEO of MongoDB Inc.; Greg Brown, CEO of Motorola Solutions; and Duncan MacMillan (B.S. 1966), co-founder of financial data and media company Bloomberg L.P. In science and technology, alumni include Peter C. Schultz (B.S. 1967), co-inventor of fiber optics; molecular geneticist Angela Christiano (Ph.D. 1991); geneticist Stanley N. Cohen (B.Sc. 1956), who pioneered in the field of gene splicing; physician Howard Krein; and Louis Gluck (B.S. 1948), the "father of neonatology".

Alumni prominent in entertainment include actor James Gandolfini (B.A. 1983) (The Sopranos); chef Mario Batali (B.A. 1982); David Stern (B.A. 1963), former commissioner of the National Basketball Association; director Henry Selick (Disney's The Nightmare Before Christmas); actor Michael Sorvino; Holly Black; actor Sebastian Stan (Captain America: The Winter Soldier); cartoon character Mr Magoo; actress Jessica Darrow (Encanto); voice actor John DiMaggio (Futurama, Adventure Time); guitarist Frank Iero (My Chemical Romance), actor Roy Scheider (Jaws); Twitch streamer Hasan Piker; Hip-Hop producer Just Blaze; and actress Calista Flockhart (Ally McBeal).

=== Faculty ===
Ruth Bader Ginsburg served as a professor at Rutgers Law School for nine years from 1963 to 1972, and later served as an associate justice of the Supreme Court of the United States. During his 20-year tenure at Rutgers, David Levering Lewis, a former history professor, was twice awarded the Pulitzer Prize for Biography or Autobiography (1994 and 2001) for both volumes of his biography of W. E. B. Du Bois (1868–1963), and also won the Bancroft Prize and the Francis Parkman Prize. Poet Gregory Pardlo won the 2015 Pulitzer Prize for Poetry; he is both an alumnus and faculty member at the Camden campus. Michael R. Douglas, a prominent string theorist and the director of the New High Energy Theory Center, won the Sackler Prize in theoretical physics in 2000. Family Research Council director Jennifer Bauwens taught in the Rutgers School of Social Work. Avery Brooks, a Rutgers graduate, taught at Mason Gross School of the Arts. Former professor Ruth Chang is an expert in decision-making and a fellow at Oxford. Literature scholar Ankhi Mukherjee, now at University of Oxford, won the Rose Mary Crawshay prize. Former English professor at Rutgers-Newark Jayne Anne Phillips won the Pulitzer Prize for Fiction in 2024. Jerry Fodor, Zenon Pylyshyn, Stephen Stich and Frances Egan were awarded the Jean Nicod Prize in philosophy and cognitive science. Endre Szemerédi was awarded the Abel Prize in 2012. Mario Szegedy was awarded the Gödel Prize twice, in 2001 and 2005.

Many other faculty members have received the highest awards in their fields, including Guggenheim and MacArthur "Genius Award" fellowships, Pulitzer Prize winners, National Medal of Science and National Medal of Technology recipients, and a National Endowment for the Arts "Jazz Master". As of 2013, 37 science, engineering, and medical faculty were members of the four "National Academies"—the National Academy of Sciences, the National Academy of Engineering, the Institute of Medicine, and the National Research Council.

== See also ==
- 2011 Rutgers tuition protests
- List of Rutgers University people
- List of Rutgers University presidents

== Bibliography ==
- H.M. Berman, J. Westbrook, Z. Feng, G. Gilliland, T.N. Bhat, H. Weissig, I.N. Shindyalov, P.E. Bourne: The Protein Data Bank. Nucleic Acids Research, 28, pp. 235–242 (2000).
- Demarest, William Henry Steele. History of Rutgers College: 1776–1924. (New Brunswick, New Jersey: Rutgers College, 1924).
- History of Rutgers College: or an account of the union of Rutgers College, and the Theological Seminary of the General Synod of the Reformed Dutch Church. Prepared and published at the request of several trustees of the College, by a trustee. (New York: Anderson & Smith, 1833).
- Lukac, George J. (ed.), Aloud to Alma Mater. (New Brunswick, New Jersey: Rutgers University Press, 1966), 70–73.
- McCormick, Richard P. Rutgers: a Bicentennial History. (New Brunswick, New Jersey: Rutgers University Press, 1966). ISBN 0-8135-0521-6.
- Schmidt, George P. Princeton, and Rutgers: The Two Colonial Colleges of New Jersey. (Princeton, New Jersey: Van Nostrand, 1964).
