= 2011 Rutgers tuition protests =

Series of student protests

The 2011 Rutgers Tuition Protests were a series of primarily student-led public education reform initiatives at Rutgers University in New Brunswick, New Jersey. Faced with rising education costs, diminished state subsidies and the possibility of a non-existent tuition cap, campus groups (including the Rutgers Student Union, the Rutgers One Coalition and the Rutgers University Student Assembly, supported by New Jersey United Students), mobilized to keep the increase in annual student financial obligation to a minimum through marches, sit-ins, letters to administration officials, and forums.

== State and federal legislation ==
The Pell Grant, a federal annuity of $5,500 available to low-income students, faced a relatively steep cut in 2011 as Republicans in the United States House of Representatives pushed for further limits on discretionary spending. In 2008, this program provided in excess of $31 million to over 10,000 Rutgers University students.

Rich Williams, an advocate of the New Jersey Public Interest Research Group, stated that grants are the principal method in which the federal government can assist students in battling rising college tuition costs. He opined that if changes are made to the current program, 1.5 million students would be at risk of losing their funding, while the remaining 7.7 million students could see a 15 percent drop in the amount of attainable awards. During the 2010–2011 academic year, 68 percent of Rutgers students reportedly borrowed through a federal loan program at some point in their collegiate career.

Governor Chris Christie's proposed budget showed a $25 million increase in tuition aid for college students. On the other hand, there are combined decreases of $7.7 million in state funding for the New Jersey Student Tuition Assistance Reward Scholarship program and other student aid programs. David Redlawsk, poll director, stated that the governor understands the state's responsibility to do more for higher education and is protecting the university.

== Tuition policy ==
Typical in-state students pay $12,755 annually in tuition and mandatory fees, excluding room and board, while out-of-state students pay $25,417 in tuition and fees. A breakdown of the tuition and fees (by semester) is as follows: tuition, campus fee, school fee, off-campus campus fee, dormitory charges, meal plan, computer fee, NJPIRG fee, Targum fee and course fee. According to the Rutgers University Board of Governors, tuition and fee rates are set in July.

== Contributing factors ==
At a glance the cause of the Rutgers tuition protests appear to be simple; however, further scrutiny in the matter reveal local, state and federal involvement to play a more central role in these events. Three years ago, Rutgers froze pay raises on staff and faculty. The union decided in good faith to share the burden with the university and withheld raises for one year. Since then, the university still has not paid raises, amounting to $40 million. In addition, the American Association of University Professors recently funded an independent research on the university's budget, conducted by Howard Bunsis of Eastern Michigan University. Test results showed that the faculty's salary raises were stagnant despite a $177 million surplus in the budget the previous year. The university has yet to confirm this study's analysis.

New federal and state health care laws are also affecting the rise in tuition costs. Legislations requiring full-time college and university students to have health insurance will subsequently raise the cost of minimum coverage provided by the university. James Breeding, director of Risk Management and Insurance at Rutgers, stated, "Effective this coming year, we are going to have a hard waiver program that has a minimum limit of $100,000," he continues, "an increase of between $600 and $800 from the mandatory coverage provided currently with a limit of $5,000 at about $170 per student, which anyone without insurance must pay." Students without health insurance are compelled to buy into this particular program, but at competitive costs. Those with insurance can opt out of the hard waiver program, a change from the former policy regarding a mandatory fee on students' bills.

Recent outbreaks at Rutgersfest have also worried students about tuition costs. Rutgersfest is an annual block party and concert hosting tens of thousands of people to celebrate the end of the school year. The event typically garners major artists to perform and provides a plethora of games for students to play. Students pay almost $1,200 in campus and student fees each year, of which a portion of the fees go to Rutgersfest. Free and open to the public, the event had between 40,000 and 50,000 attendees this year, including high school and college students from other schools. However, four confirmed shootings at the event proves Rutgersfest too dangerous and will permanently close, says University President Richard L. McCormick. Based on these events, one student urged a limitation on student-run programming, suggesting that their student fees are being wasted.

== Protests ==
On April 13, 2011, hundreds of Rutgers students and demonstrators marched from Voorhees Mall to Old Queens on the New Brunswick campus protesting tuition hikes and diminishing financial aid to higher education. The President commended the students on their campaign; however, he could not promise them a tuition freeze. The New Jersey United Students' (NJUS) "Walk in Action" protest brought tuition increases to the forefront of university issues.

Since the protest march, a group of students representing a variety of campus organizations has scheduled regular meetings with President McCormick. In 2010, "a cap limited the increase in tuition to 4 percent, but this year, public colleges are likely to have the ability to set their own rates, meaning the rise could be higher...President McCormick predicted the tuition increases would be less than 10 percent."

On Wednesday April 27, approximately 20 students occupied a third- floor landing of Old Queens, the administrative building and office of President McCormick, with a list of demands to the university President. The students claimed that President McCormick had yet to meet their demands by their deadline two days ago. Their demands included requesting McCormick to support a tuition freeze, place three students on the Rutgers Board of Governors as voting members and provide students with 10 free transcripts. They also demanded an increase in wages for Rutgers workers whose salaries were currently frozen.

Of the students who were involved with the sit-in, 11 had announced they would be spending the night in the building. They were willing to "stay until their demands have been met and prepared to be arrested." One reporter noted that during the sit-in, "students used Skype and other internet sites to view the classes they were missing and receive notes from their classmates. Other students also brought the protesters pizza, juice boxes, ice cream, strawberries and other food."

Students were notified by the university officials that they were "trespassing" but stood no risk of arrest at the time of the announcement.

Other students around campus gathered in front of Old Queens in support of the protestors. Roughly 30 students showed up that evening and pitched a tent with a sign that read, "Education is a right." Some students marched around the area to the beat of bongo drums, chanting, "The administration ain't so tough, unless they put us all in cuffs."

The sit-in lasted until Thursday evening, by which time only 9 students remained. The group voluntarily left despite the university not having agreed with any of their listed demands. No arrests were made.

In the following July, the Board of Governors voted on a 1.8 percent tuition increase, the lowest in two decades.
