= Student Sustainable Farm at Rutgers =

Farm of Rutgers University in New Jersey

The Student Sustainable Farm at Rutgers is located at Rutgers' Horticultural Research Station in New Brunswick, New Jersey, on the G. H. Cook campus of Rutgers University.

The farm, which has 5 acres (20,000 m^{2}) of land under cultivation, runs on the Community Supported Agriculture model: up to 150 participating households purchase a "share" in the farm at the start of the season. In return they receive a weekly portion of each week's harvest of organically grown produce. Over the course of the season, the farm grows over a dozen different types of herbs and 30 kinds of vegetables, including many heirloom varieties not commonly seen in markets.

The farm offers paid summer internships for students at Rutgers University from the School of Environmental and Biological Sciences, providing them with hands-on experience in the production and management of a small organic farm.

== History ==
The farm originated as the Cook Student Organic Farm (CSOF) in 1993. The initial goals of the farm were to

1. give students the opportunity to grow vegetables organically
2. give students the experience of managing an operating farm
3. help students address the issues of hunger within the local community
4. be financially self-sustaining, and
5. provide hands on leadership training for Rutgers undergraduates.

Farm production began during the 1994 growing season. The initial land under cultivation was 1.25 acres (5,100 m^{2}), and 24 shareholders participated at a cost of $150 each.

In the early years, grants and money from Rutgers University helped to meet many of the initial start-up costs. After the farm became established and was able to sell more shares and generate more income, it became a self-sustaining enterprise.

During the 1999 growing season the cultivated land was expanded to 3 acres (12,000 m^{2}), and 125 shareholders participated at a cost of $250 per share. After 2008, the acreage was expanded to 5 acres (20,000 m^{2}), with 150 shareholders participating.

In 2010, in order to comply with federal regulations regarding the use of the word "Organic", the name of the farm was changed to "The Student Sustainable Farm at Rutgers".

== Farm Operation ==
A faculty member serves as the advisor. He is responsible for the management of farm finances, including collection of shareholder fees, hiring of interns, purchase of materials and financial reporting. He coordinates efforts between Rutgers University, the interns, and the shareholders, and trains the interns in the use and maintenance of the farming equipment. In addition, he meets weekly with the interns to discuss the work needed to keep the farm running smoothly.

Under the direction of the farm advisor, the interns manage all aspects of the farm. These student farmers cultivate and maintain the fields, bring in the weekly harvest, determine how much of each vegetable will be in that week's share, and post a description of the share in the pickup shed. They are present when shareholders come to pick up their produce, replenishing the various vegetables as the bins run low, and are available to answer any questions the shareholders have about the vegetables and how to prepare them. The interns also publish a weekly newsletter, The Cover Crop, containing notes about the farm, articles about vegetables, recipes, and other information.

One challenge faced by student-run farms is that their labor force is constantly shifting. One intern at the Cook College farm said, "the only bad thing about [our farm] is the turnover rate."

=== Shares ===
The farm's shares are sold in April of each year, first being offered to shareholders from the previous year, and then to a waiting list. Income from sales of the shares pays the interns' salaries and the cost of seeds and other supplies.

Share prices take into account:

1. the total amount of money that is needed for supplies, equipment and labor,
2. the amount of food that can be produced, and
3. the total number of shareholders that will invest

One share supplies the vegetable needs of about 2 people. On average, this is about 10-15 lb. of produce per week, although this is highly variable—in the early weeks when lettuce and spinach are in season, the share weighs less than later in the season when tomatoes, potatoes, and watermelon are available. The market value of each week's organically grown vegetables typically exceeds the cost of the shareholder's investment.

Unlike some CSA's, where the share is prepared by the farmer, the shareholders assemble their week's share from the produce set out by the interns.

=== About Organic Farming ===
All the produce at the Student Sustainable Farm is organically farmed.

Rather than using chemical pesticides, herbicides, and most commercial fertilizers; the farmers use an understanding of natural ecosystems including pest-plant relationships and soil management techniques such as crop rotation, cover cropping, and inter-planting.

The student farm is not officially USDA-certified organic. It is not currently a viable option because of time commitments in certification and the intern turnover rates.

=== Connections to Community ===
The purpose of the Student Sustainable Farm is to supply produce to its shareholders and also to other members of the community. A portion of the harvest is distributed each week to the New Brunswick soup kitchen, Elijah's Promise. Occasionally surplus produce is also sent to food banks and other charitable organizations.

Community Supported Agriculture fosters more than economic relationships. Social links are often formed through CSAs that can have important consequences. Growers are in touch with shareholders on a weekly basis, sharing news about the farm and getting feedback about the produce. Shareholders have the opportunity to see a farm in operation and even help with production if they choose. Shareholders also come to understand what can be produced seasonally in the local climate, and often receive unusual varieties of vegetables that are not found in supermarkets.

== The Farm as Educational Reference ==
Other student-run farms that have used the Cook Student Organic Farm's Handbook as a resource in establishing their operations include

University of Vermont Common Ground Student-Run Farm

Michigan State University Student Organic Farm

University of Idaho in Moscow Soil Stewards Farm

== The Farm as Educational Experience ==
A survey conducted by the Rodale Institute has identified more than forty on-campus farms in the US. In the past decade alone, farm projects have been established at over a dozen schools, including Rutgers University, Cornell University, Michigan State University, New Mexico State University, Vassar College, Bennington College, Oberlin College, and the University of Vermont. One indicator of the success of the students' experience as farmers is how the participants use their skills after graduation. For example, of the approximately thousand students who have gone through the apprenticeship at University of California at Santa Cruz's Farm and Alan Chadwick Garden since it was established over 40 years ago, an estimated 75 percent have gone on to ag-related careers.

Three former interns of the Student Sustainable Farm pooled their years of experience as farmers and farm managers and founded a CSA of their own in Pennsylvania, on a farm that has belonged to one of their families for 150 years. They also worked with the local food bank and offered gardening classes for both adults and children.

== Bibliography ==
- Rutgers Focus Magazine, April 22, 2009: Rutgers' organic farm invests in students' skills
- Rodale Institute Farming for Credit
- Cook Student Organic Farm Handbook, Rutgers University, New Brunswick, NJ
