= Rutgers graduation speech incident =

On April 30, 2026, Rutgers School of Engineering cancelled its May 15, 2026, graduation speech by businessman and alumnus Rami Elghandour, after several students complained of his critical social media posts "focused on Israel". Elghandour's invitation to speak was rescinded by School of Engineering dean Alberto Cuitiño.

== Background ==
Rami Elghandour is a CEO and chairman of biotechnology company Arcellx, which develops immunotherapies for autoimmune disease and cancer. He received his bachelor's degree in electrical and computer engineering from Rutgers School of Engineering in 2001. On March 31, 2026, Elghandour was featured in an alumni spotlight on the School of Engineering website.

Elghandour frequently posts on social media about the footage and news articles of violence in the West Bank and Gaza, with commentary characterizing Israeli actions as apartheid and war crimes. He was an executive producer of the 2026 film The Voice of Hind Rajab.

The convocation ceremony was held on May 15, 2026, at Jersey Mike’s Arena in Piscataway.

== Speech cancellation ==
In a statement given to Jewish Telegraphic Agency, Dory Devlin, a Rutgers University representative, wrote, "The Rutgers School of Engineering was recently informed that some graduating students would not attend their graduation ceremony due to concerns about the invited speaker’s social media posts, including one that shared an inflammatory claim," adding "After discussing these concerns with the speaker, the School of Engineering has rescinded the convocation speaker invitation to Rami Elghandour." Devlin subsequently confirmed the offending posts were focused on Israel.

Devlin subsequently cited Elghandour's April 20, 2026, tweet, where he wrote, "They’ve committed genocide. They’re running dungeons where they train dogs to sexually assault prisoners … Weapons embargo is the absolute minimum. Sanctions and diplomatic isolation are beyond justified" in reference to Israel.

A spokesperson added in a statement to The Guardian, "This decision keeps the focus on our engineering students and honors the celebratory spirit of the event to ensure that no graduate feels forced to choose between their personal convictions and a convocation ceremony."

In a call to Elghandour on April 30, 2026, dean Cuitiño told him he was cancelling the speech as a result of student complaints. According to a resolution passed on May 12, 2026, by the Rutgers University Senate, the dean had stated students "no longer felt comfortable attending the convocation ceremony with him as the speaker," referring to Elghandour.

A university spokesperson did not specific if Elghandour would be replaced with another graduation speaker.

== Reaction ==
Elghandour characterized the cancellation as "racist" and "frankly un-American and unconstitutional" in an interview with The Record and the USA TODAY Network.

Elghandour, in an interview with The Guardian, said, "I think [Palestine] is the moral issue of our time and I believe it’s been used to undermine democratic institutions in the US." He referred to his cancelled speech as an "erosion of free speech and the first amendment," adding "what is most puzzling to me is that they champion me for my humanitarian views and now they’re canceling me for them," referencing the March 31, 2026, alumni spotlight in which Elghandour's role in producing The Voice of Hind Rajab was referenced.

Elghandour plans to record his speech and post it.

On May 6, 2026, the progressive non-profit Center for Constitutional Rights wrote a letter to Rutgers leadership, alleging they had violated Elghandour's first amendment rights.

On May 11, 2026, a public petition calling for Elghandour's reinstatement as graduation speaker reached over 36,000 signatures. That day, students, staff, and faculty at Rutgers led a protest on the Busch campus to protest Elghandour's removal.

On May 12, 2026, the Rutgers University Senate formally censured School of Engineering dean Alberto Cuitiño, issuing a resolution that wrote the decision was “one-sided, opaque, and harmful" the University.

The Rutgers AAUP-AFT and the Rutgers Adjunct Faculty Union issued a joint statement calling on dean Cuitiño to reinstate Elghandour as graduation speaker. The statement said, "[It] clearly reflects a broader pattern of universities applying a Palestine exception to their stated commitments to free speech," adding the cancellation was "a direct violation of the university’s stated commitment to free speech and inquiry."

Representative Josh Gottheimer praised the university's decision to cancel the in a social media post, writing that Rutgers "should not platform voices that promote hate."

== Speech ==
On May 13, 2026, Elghandour posted the full speech on a YouTube video.

The 28 minute video featured an introduction in response to Rutgers's cancellation of his speech and a reflection on the significance of the speech. On social media posts publishing the speech, Elghandour wrote "Let's be proud of who we are,. They can't erase us. They won't silence us. Truth, Justice, and the American Way Free speech and free Palestine."

That day, Rutgers issued a statement writing, “the Rutgers School of Engineering dean made the right decision to disinvite the speaker," adding, “our concerns about the speaker were valid."

== See also ==
- Palestine exception – Restrictions on pro-Palestine speech
