= Streptomyces purpureus =

Scientific classification
- Domain: Bacteria
- Kingdom: Bacillati
- Phylum: Actinomycetota
- Class: Actinomycetes
- Order: Streptomycetales
- Family: Streptomycetaceae
- Genus: Streptomyces
- Species: S. purpureus

Binomial name
- Streptomyces purpureus Goodfellow et al. 1986

Type strain
- AS 4.1225, ATCC 27787, BCRC 12101, CCRC 12101, CGMCC 4.1225, DSM 43362, FERM-P 175, IFO 13927, IMET 9041, JCM 3172, KA-279, KCC 3172, KCC A-0172, KCTC 9187, KI-104078, Lanoot R-8734, LMG 19368, Matsumae KA-279, Matsumai KA-279, NBRC 13927, NCIB 11311, NCIMB 11311, NRRL B-5403, R-8734, VKM Ac-1298, VTT E-072761

Synonyms
- Kitasatoa diplospora, Kitasatoa kauaiensis, Kitasatoa nagasakiensis, Kitasatoa purpurea

Species of bacterium

Streptomyces purpureus is a bacterium species from the genus of Streptomyces which has been isolated from soil. Streptomyces purpureus produces chloramphenicol, bottromycin and fradicin.

== See also ==
- List of Streptomyces species
