= Kirkpatrick Chapel =

Chapel in New Brunswick, New Jersey, US

Coordinates: 40.49875°N 074.44575°W

Sophia Astley Kirkpatrick Memorial Chapel
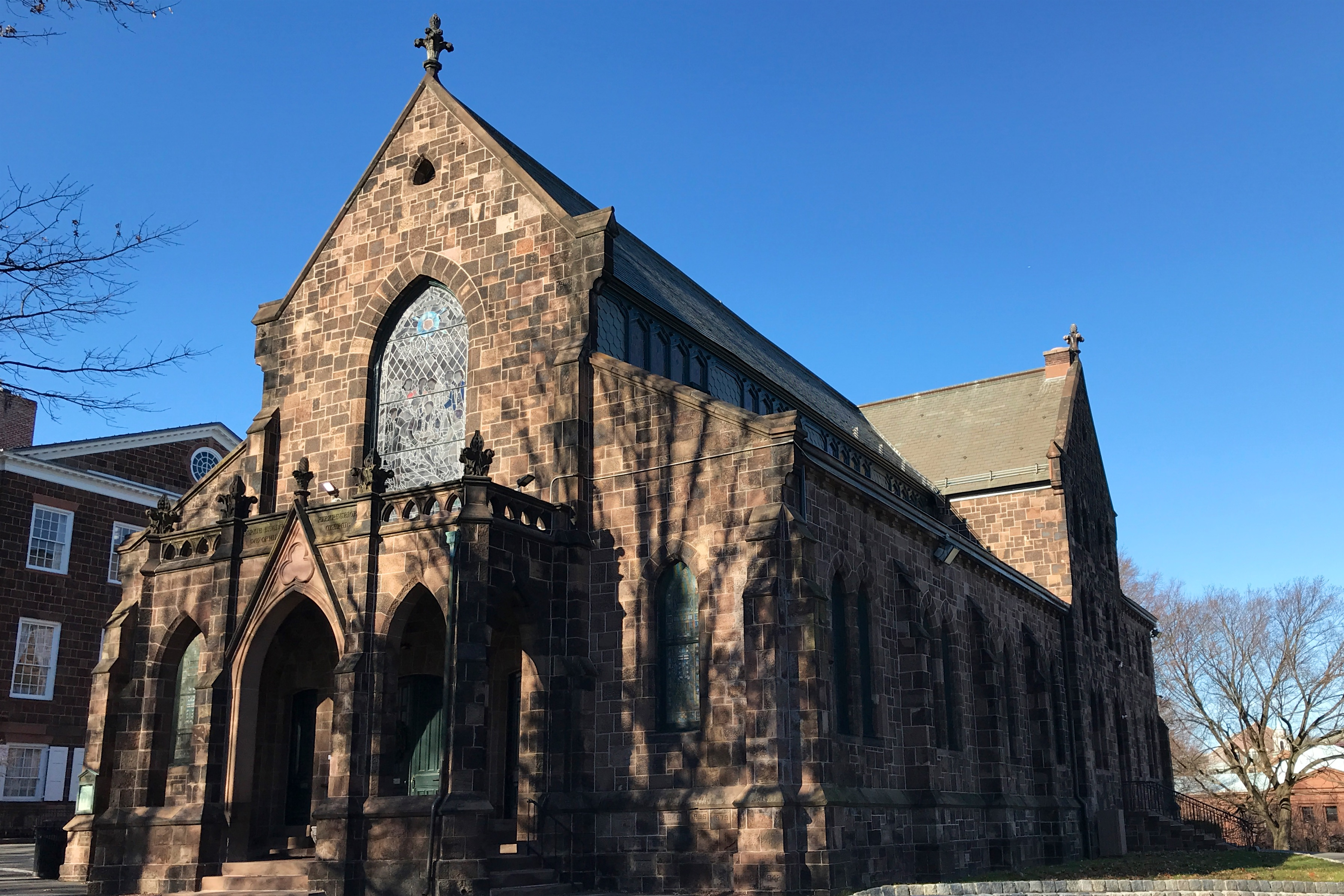
- Kirkpatrick Chapel in 2018

Religion
- Affiliation: Non-denominational
- Year consecrated: 1873
- Status: University chapel

Location
- Location: Queens Campus, Rutgers University, New Brunswick, New Jersey
- Interactive map of Sophia Astley Kirkpatrick Memorial Chapel

Architecture
- Architect: Henry Janeway Hardenbergh
- Style: Gothic Revival
- Funded by: Bequest from Sophia Astley Kirkpatrick
- Completed: 1873
- Construction cost: $52,204.57 (2013: US$1,003,893.88) (Note: This inflation adjustment calculation projects that $1 in 1871 and 1872 would have $19.23 in purchasing power in 2013 (conversion factor: 0.052), using data compiled by Oregon State University Political Science professor Robert Sahr in "Inflation Conversion Factors for years 1774 to estimated 2023, in dollars of recent years" reflecting final 2012 CPI (2.29594 in dollars of 1982–84). Last update May 15, 2013. Retrieved September 2, 2013.)

Specifications
- Capacity: 650
- Length: 116 feet (35 m)
- Width: 57.5 feet (18 m)
- Height (max): 55 feet (17 m)
- Materials: Brownstone

Website
- www.kirkpatrickchapel.rutgers.edu

- Kirkpatrick Chapel
- U.S. Historic district – Contributing property
- Location within Middlesex County, New Jersey
- Part of: Queens Campus, Rutgers University (ID73001113)
- Designated CP: July 2, 1973

The Sophia Astley Kirkpatrick Memorial Chapel, known as Kirkpatrick Chapel, is the chapel to Rutgers, The State University of New Jersey and located on the university's main campus in New Brunswick, New Jersey in the United States. Kirkpatrick Chapel is among the university's oldest extant buildings, and one of six buildings located on a historic section of the university's College Avenue Campus in New Brunswick known as the Queens Campus. Built in 1872 when Rutgers was a small, private liberal arts college, the chapel was designed by architect Henry Janeway Hardenbergh at the beginning of his career. Hardenbergh, a native of New Brunswick, was the great-great-grandson of Rutgers' first president, the Rev. Jacob Rutsen Hardenbergh. It was the third of three projects that Hardenbergh designed for the college.

Kirkpatrick Chapel was named in honour of Sophia Astley Kirkpatrick. Kirkpatrick was the wife of Littleton Kirkpatrick, a local attorney and politician who was a member of the board of trustees of Rutgers College from 1841 until his death in 1859. When Sophia Kirkpatrick died in 1871, Rutgers was named as the residuary legatee of her estate. A bequest of $61,054.57 (2013: US$1,174,079.38) from her estate funded the construction of the chapel. According to Rutgers, this marked the first time in New Jersey history that an institution became a direct heir to an estate.

The chapel was designed in the High Victorian Gothic Revival style that was popular at the middle of the nineteenth century in the United States. Hardenbergh's design incorporated features common to fourteenth-century German and English Gothic churches. According to the New Jersey Historic Trust, the chapel's stained glass windows feature "some of the first opalescent and multicolored sheet glass manufactured in America." Four of the chapel's windows were created by the studios of Louis Comfort Tiffany. Kirkpatrick Chapel is a contributing property of the Queens Campus Historic District, which was added to the National Register of Historic Places on July 2, 1973.

For its first 30 years, the chapel was used as a college library and for holding daily chapel services. Although Rutgers was founded as a private college affiliated with the Dutch Reformed faith, today, it is a state university and nonsectarian. The chapel is available to students, alumni, and faculty of all faiths, and a variety of services are held throughout the academic term. It is also used for university events including convocation, concerts, alumni and faculty weddings, funerals, and lectures by prominent intellectuals and world leaders.

== History ==
=== The Kirkpatrick family and Rutgers ===
Rutgers built Kirkpatrick Chapel after receiving a $61,054.57 bequest from residual assets of the estate of Sophia Astley Kirkpatrick (pictured).

When Sophia Astley Kirkpatrick (1802–1871) died on March 6, 1871, at the age of 68, she named Rutgers College as her estate's residuary legatee. At that time, Rutgers was a small, private liberal arts college in New Brunswick, New Jersey, affiliated with the Dutch Reformed faith. Founded in 1766 as Queen's College, Rutgers is the eighth-oldest institution of higher education established in the United States. It was one of nine colleges founded in the American colonies before the Revolutionary War. Rutgers' website states that this bequest from Sophia Kirkpatrick's will was the first time in New Jersey legal history that an institution became a direct heir to an estate.

Sophia was the daughter of wealthy merchant and land investor Thomas Astley of Philadelphia. She married Littleton Kirkpatrick (1797–1859) on October 18, 1832. Littleton, an attorney and 1815 graduate of Princeton, was a member of a wealthy, prominent New Brunswick family and pursued a career in politics. They did not have any children. During his career, Littleton Kirkpatrick was elected as county surrogate, mayor of New Brunswick, and as a Whig Party member of the United States House of Representatives during the Twenty-Eighth Congress (1843–1845). He served as a trustee of Rutgers College for 18 years from 1841 until his death in 1859. Sophia remained in New Brunswick after her husband's death. A devoted member of the city's First Presbyterian Church, she was later described as having "adorned her profession by her Christian graces and her many deeds of charity and beneficence to the needy and suffering."

Littleton Kirkpatrick was the son of Jane Bayard and Judge Andrew Kirkpatrick who served as Chief Justice of the New Jersey Supreme Court. He was grandson of Philadelphia merchant and statesman Colonel John Bayard (1738–1807) who served as speaker of the Pennsylvania Assembly, delegate to the Continental Congress, judge, mayor of New Brunswick, and was a Revolutionary War hero.

The Kirkpatrick family had a long association with Queen's College and subsequently with Rutgers. Several members of the family served as trustees or received degrees from the college, including the following:

- Littleton's father, Andrew Kirkpatrick (1756–1831), a 1775 graduate of Princeton, taught at the Queen's College Grammar School in 1782, received an honorary Masters (A.M.) from Queen's College in 1783, and served as a trustee from 1782 to 1809.
- Littleton's brother, John Bayard Kirkpatrick, Esq. (1795–1864), was an 1815 graduate of Rutgers when it was Queen's College.
- Littleton's nephew, Andrew Kirkpatrick (1844–1904), studied at Rutgers from 1860 to 1862 before receiving a bachelor's degree from Union College in 1863.
- Another nephew, John Bayard Kirkpatrick Jr. (1844–1912), received a bachelor's degree in 1866 and later served as college trustee (1892–1912).
- John Bayard Kirkpatrick III (1878–1961) received his Bachelor of Science degree in 1900.

=== Hardenbergh's design and construction ===
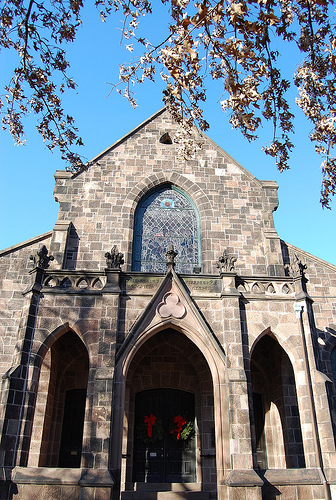
The triple gallery porch at the chapel's East Portal suggests a fourteenth-century German Gothic style.

In 1870, the trustees of Rutgers College had decided to build a college chapel when the funds became available to do so. Previously, chapel services had been held inside Old Queen's, but as the student body expanded in the 1850s and 1860s a larger space was needed to accommodate such events. With the death of Sophia Astley Kirkpatrick in 1871 and Rutgers receiving $61,054.57 (2013: US$1,174,079.38) from her estate, the trustees directed those funds to the building of a university chapel.

A young architect who had recently completed his apprenticeship and started his own firm, Henry Janeway Hardenbergh (1847–1918), was hired by the trustees in 1870 to design an addition to the Rutgers College Grammar School then housed in Alexander Johnston Hall located across from the Queen's Campus on College Avenue. He charged the college $312 for his work. Born and raised in New Brunswick, Hardenbergh received the contract through family connections. His great-great-grandfather, the Rev. Jacob Rutsen Hardenbergh (1735–1790), was Rutgers' first president and one of its founders. Further, several members of his family were graduates, trustees, or otherwise associated with the school through the nineteenth century. His grandfather, Rev. Jacob Janeway served as vice president of the college, and turned down the post of president in 1840. Hardenbergh studied for five years as an apprentice draftsman under German-American architect Detlef Lienau. Lienau was also connected with projects in the city of New Brunswick and later designed the Gardner A. Sage Library (1875) on the campus of New Brunswick Theological Seminary after Hardenbergh's earlier design for the seminary's Suydam Hall, built in 1873.

After completing the addition to Alexander Johnston Hall in 1870, Hardenbergh was hired to design a Gothic Revival-style Geological Hall that was erected in 1872 on the south side of Old Queen's; the hall was built with funds Rutgers had received from the federal government in becoming New Jersey's land grant college and from the university's first fundraising campaign. The new chapel, designed by Hardenbergh to complement the Geological Hall, would be built on Old Queens north side. Kirkpatrick Chapel was the third of three projects that Hardenbergh designed for Rutgers College. Hardenbergh was at the beginning of his career, and later would design several hotels and skyscrapers in American cities, including designing New York City's Plaza Hotel and the Dakota Building on Central Park among other Edwardian-period buildings. After his death in 1918, Architectural Record celebrated Hardenbergh as "one of the most august and inspiring figures that American architecture has produced."

Kirkpatrick Chapel was erected on a hilltop on which Alexander Hamilton, then an artillery captain commanding sixty men of the New York Provincial Company of Artillery, was thought to have placed his cannons to cover the retreat of George Washington's forces after the British occupation of New York. After the British victory in taking Fort Washington in November 1776, Washington's forces retreated across New Jersey and into Pennsylvania. Hamilton's battery protected the forces as they crossed the Raritan River and passed through New Brunswick in 1776. British forces commanded by Lieutenant General Lord Cornwallis under orders from Lieutenant General William Howe, 5th Viscount Howe pursued Washington as far as New Brunswick. A historic marker erected as a gift of the Class of 1899 is located next to the chapel, though a more accurate marker is located near the Rutgers Academic Building.

Kirkpatrick Chapel was completed at a cost of $52,204.57 (2013: US$1,003,893.88), and dedicated on December 3, 1873. The chapel, seating 350 people, occupied the front section of the present building. The rear of the building had lecture rooms, the office of the college president, a meeting room for the trustees on the first floor, and a library on the second floor.

In August 1916, workmen began to convert Kirkpatrick Chapel into one large assembly room to be used exclusively as the college's chapel. William P. Hardenbergh, the brother of the architect Henry J. Hardenbergh, donated $10,000 (2013: US$212,800) (Note: This inflation adjustment calculation projects that $1 in 1916 would have $21.28 in purchasing power in 2013 (conversion factor: 0.047), using data compiled by Oregon State University Political Science professor Robert Sahr in "Inflation Conversion Factors for years 1774 to estimated 2023, in dollars of recent years" reflecting final 2012 CPI (2.29594 in dollars of 1982–84). Last update May 15, 2013. Retrieved September 2, 2013.) for this purpose in honour of his ancestor who served as the college's first president. Work proceeded quickly and was completed in two months before the college's planned 150th anniversary celebrations scheduled in October. The inner partitions that separated the chapel from the former library and other rooms were removed. The removal of the partitions expanded the capacity of the chapel from 350 persons to 800. However, current fire codes limit capacity to 650.

=== As the college chapel (1873–present) ===
Kirkpatrick Chapel in the winter of 1891

For its first fifty years, Kirkpatrick Chapel was used for daily worship services by the Rutgers College student body. By 1926, the increasing size of the student body had forced Rutgers to stop daily mandatory chapel services and hold services for underclassmen on Monday, Wednesday, and Friday; and for upperclassman on Tuesday and Thursday. Within a few years, continued growth in the student body reduced that schedule to each class meeting in chapel only one day per week. Sunday chapel services were attended by all students who chose to remain on campus for the weekend. Kirkpatrick Chapel is one of two college chapels on Rutgers' New Brunswick campuses. The other, Voorhees Chapel, was built in 1925 after a donation from Elizabeth Rodman Voorhees to the New Jersey College for Women, later Douglass College, which was later merged into Rutgers.

After Rutgers transitioned from a private church-affiliated college to a non-sectarian public university after World War II, the role of the chapel transitioned to less frequent worship services and religious use to providing a venue for the university's special events—including convocations, lectures, programs, and classes. Despite this transition, the chapel still has a place in the continuing traditions of the university. Since 1876, graduating classes would have a stone on the exterior of the chapel carved with their class year. Early classes chose the stone while today, new classes engrave stones that located next to the class that graduated 50 years before. Further, the chapel is frequently booked for weddings, baptisms, memorial services and concerts. The university's 50-member Kirkpatrick Choir, the all-male Rutgers University Glee Club, and other musical groups at the university's Mason Gross School of the Arts frequently use the chapel for concerts.

=== As the college library (1873–1903) ===
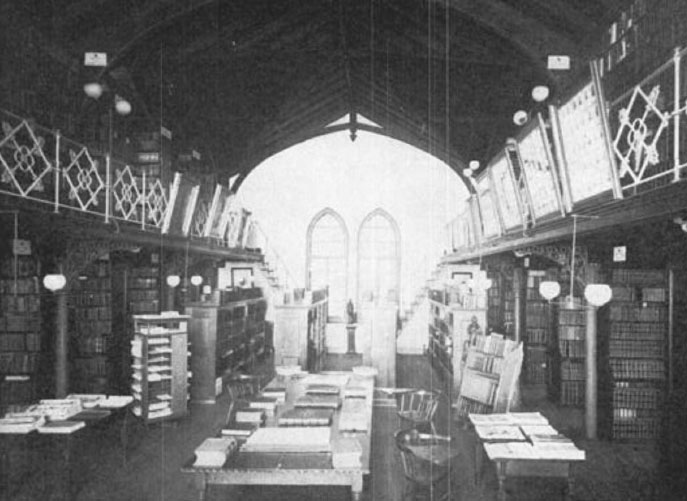
The college's library (circa 1890s) was located on the second floor of the rear section of Kirkpatrick Chapel. This area was converted into part of the chapel's chancel in a 1916 renovation.

According to Demarest, after the building was completed, college president William Henry Campbell was charged with raising $3,000 to acquire reference books for the library. An 1876 survey by the U.S. Bureau of Education reported that Rutgers held 6,814 volumes in its college library and 3,800 in libraries of its two student literary societies—the Peithessophian Society and Philoclean Society. In 1884, President Merrill Gates appointed a recent alumnus then serving as the college's registrar, treasurer, and faculty secretary—Irving S. Upson (A.B. 1881)—to take on additional responsibilities as librarian. Upson agreed "to devote at least one hour a day to library work, for which he received a stipend of $15 a month, out of which he paid an assistant $2.50 per week. At this time, the library was open daily from 8:00 to 8:40 A.M., noon to 12:30 P.M., and 2:00 to 4:30 P.M." Upson increased the holdings by 21,000 volumes before informing the president and trustees in 1894 that the library was inadequate to house the collection. The trustees feared that the collection posed a fire hazard or would collapse the floor of the second-floor library.

By 1903 the library in Kirkpatrick Chapel housed 45,000 books that were "crowded on the shelves, many hid behind others, and piled on the floor" and that the library was fast becoming too small to accommodate. After reading of the college's effort to build a new library in a Reformed Church publication, Ralph Voorhees and his wife Elizabeth Rodman Voorhees contacted president Austin Scott for the library plans and an estimate of construction costs. Voorhees and his wife, whose wealth came as an inheritance from her family's shipping and importing business, donated $59,000 (2013: US$1,552,880) (Note: This inflation adjustment calculation projects that $1 in 1903 would have $26.32 in purchasing power in 2013 (conversion factor: 0.038), using data compiled by Oregon State University Political Science professor Robert Sahr in "Inflation Conversion Factors for years 1774 to estimated 2023, in dollars of recent years" reflecting final 2012 CPI (2.29594 in dollars of 1982–84). Last update May 15, 2013. Retrieved September 2, 2013.) to erect a new library. $5,000 (2013: US$131,600) was added to this total from other donors to furnish the new building. The new library, called Voorhees Hall, was built on land donated by James Nielson behind Kirkpatrick Chapel that began to extend the college campus west. (Note: This tract of land would later become known as the Voorhees Mall.) Voorhees Hall was dedicated on November 10, 1903—the 140th anniversary of the signing of the college's charter—and served as the school's main library until the Archibald S. Alexander Library opened in 1956. Voorhees, who was fully blind, gave a speech and was awarded an honorary degree at the dedication ceremony.

=== Notable events ===
- On May 6, 1881, the second intercollegiate forensic debate was held at Kirkpatrick Chapel between the Peithessophian Society of Rutgers and the Philomathean Society of New York University on the topic of whether voting rights and suffrage should be limited or denied by any requirement other than age. The team from Rutgers won the debate. The first intercollegiate debate took place the night before between societies at Illinois College and Knox College.
- In 1957, American poet Robert Frost gave a poetry reading at the chapel, after an invitation by Rutgers English professor and poet John Ciardi.
- In a special ceremony held in the chapel on June 28, 1981, Rutgers belatedly presented to Queen Beatrix a 1941 honorary Doctor of Laws (LL.D.) degree that the university granted to her grandmother, Queen Wilhelmina of the Netherlands, for her bravery at the onset of World War II during the Nazi occupation of the Netherlands.

== Architecture ==
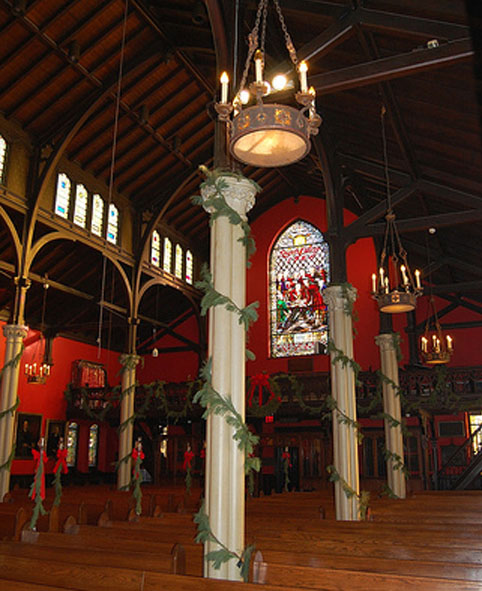
The nave of Kirkpatrick Chapel looking towards the entrance.

Kirkpatrick Chapel was designed to complement the Gothic Revival brownstone exterior masonry of Geology Hall which was constructed the year before of New Jersey brownstone after Hardenbergh's earlier proposal for brick was found to be prohibitively expensive and overbudget. Brownstone is a durable reddish-brown sandstone used for many houses and buildings in New York City and New Jersey, including Old Queen's, Geology Hall, and Kirkpatrick Chapel. Brownstone and similar materials, known as freestone, were popular for constructing stone buildings because the properties of the rock allowed it to be worked freely in every direction instead of having to be cut in one direction along a grain.

In his design for the chapel, Hardenbergh attempted a "restrained approach to Gothic architecture" that refrained from the excesses ("fripperies") of typical examples of Victorian Gothic. The facade has a porch with three archways and buttresses described in the Architectural Record of 1918 as being suggestive of German Gothic. It has lancet windows and an appearance described in the application for inclusion on the National Register as "similar to an English country church".

Internally, the chapel has a nave and aisles with the arcade supported on slender iron columns. The roof is of open timber in black walnut and stained pine. Similarly, the former library that is presently part of the expanded chapel (as of 1916) was "finished with open-timbered roof in the native wood." Both the iron columns and the walls were painted in delicate tints. The chapel was described by alumnus Michael C. Barr and architecture professor Edward Wilkens as having "a particularly graceful interior of wood" with "light, delicate proportions."

Kirkpatrick Chapel was included as part of the Queen's Campus on the New Jersey Register of Historic Places on January 29, 1973, and on the National Register of Historic Places on July 2, 1973.

== Fittings and furnishings ==
=== Organ ===
Since 1916, Kirkpatrick Chapel's services have been augmented by the force of large pipe organ regarded as one of the "finest classical examples of the instrument anywhere in the state." In 1916, the daughter of Rutgers alumnus George Buckham (A.B. 1832), donated $10,000 (2013: US$212,800) to the college for a new organ in her father's memory. Her donation coincided with the observance of Rutgers' 150th anniversary that year, and the completion of a renovation to remove the partitions dividing the chapel from the former library and classrooms. Previously, an organ purchased by the class of 1866 was located in the gallery above the chapel's narthex.

Built in 1916 as the "Opus 255" by the Ernest M. Skinner & Company of Boston, the organ featured 33 stops, 24 registers, 27 ranks, and 1606 pipes. According to Rutgers, Skinner (1866–1960) who was considered the nation's premier organ-builder in the early twentieth century, gave personal attention to the building of this organ. When the purchase of the organ was being considered in 1916, Rutgers' director of music, Howard D. McKinney (RC 1903), sought the advice of English organist T. Tertius Noble who had been installed as the organist and music director at Saint Thomas Church (Episcopal) on Fifth Avenue and 53rd Street in New York City. When it was dedicated on April 12, 1917, Noble performed an organ recital. During these years, Skinner-built organs were installed in several churches across the United States, including the chapels at Harvard University, Lafayette College, Oberlin College, for Saint Thomas Church and several for the Cathedral of St. John the Divine in New York City. In 1931, chimes were added to the Opus 255 organ's ranks and some of the reeds were repaired. The organ's components were releathered in 1957.

From 1958 to 1961, the organ was updated and rebuilt by the Aeolian-Skinner Organ Company, the successor to Ernest M. Skinner's company. University organist David A. Drinkwater oversaw the work as the organ—then renamed "Opus 255-C"—expanded to 59 stops, 52 ranks, and 3,059 pipes.

As of 2013, the chapel's organ has "gone silent" after several years of problems and failures and has been temporarily replaced with a state-of-the-art electronic organ. Rutgers has not decided whether it will restore the organ or replace it with a new pipe organ as the university considers the possibility of undertaking a larger restoration of the chapel.

As of December 2019, a replacement organ, an Appleton Organ from 1840 had been located and purchased with intention of an inauguration concert occurring on November 11, 2019, but was later canceled and is not installed as of December 9 and its location is unknown, but a recital is meant to be held on it February 16, 2020.

=== Stained glass windows ===
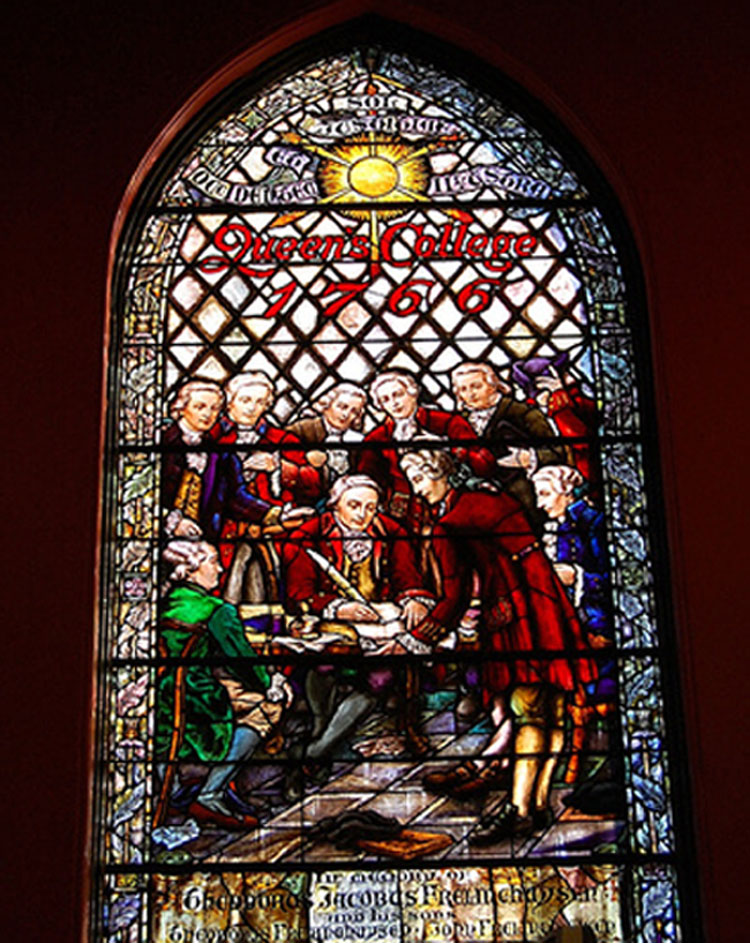
The Queen's College Charter Window above the chapel's narthex was donated in honour of Rev. Theodorus Jacobus Frelinghuysen, who was instrumental in founding the college.

Among the stained glass windows at Kirkpatrick Chapel are approximately twenty lancet windows along the chapel's side aisles that were donated by graduating classes at the turn of the nineteenth and twentieth centuries (1890–1912). These windows depict their class year and phrases in Ancient Greek and Latin.

Four of the chapel's windows were designed and crafted in the studios of Louis Comfort Tiffany (1848–1933). Tiffany and Hardenbergh were acquainted through their work with the Architectural League of New York. According to the New Jersey Historic Trust, the windows are "some of the first opalescent and multicolored sheet glass manufactured in America." Opalescent glass, used often in Tiffany glass windows, is glass in which more than one colour is present and caused in the manufacture by fusing through two colors being laminated, or through a superficial application of metallic oxide solutions.

The four windows from the Tiffany studios include those donated by the college's Class of 1899 and Class of 1900. A window depicting Joan of Arc was donated in memory of Rutgers College sophomore Henry Janeway Weston (1877–1898) who committed suicide in 1898. According to Rutgers, this window was a gift of the Tiffany studios. Weston, the grandson of Henry Latimer Janeway (1824–1909)—a wealthy wallpaper manufacturer, Rutgers alumnus (A.B. 1844, A.M. 1847) and long-serving trustee (1862–1909)—killed himself after his family became aware of a romantic relationship with a woman that would have negatively affected his reputation.

The large window in the chancel above the altar, titled "Jesus, the Teacher of the Ages", was also designed by Tiffany studios. It was donated by William P. Hardenbergh after the renovation of the chapel in 1916 and dedicated to his great-great-grandfather and the college's first president, the Rev. Jacob Rutsen Hardenbergh (1735–1790). A large window over the narthex (or the entrance of the chapel) and a choir loft commemorates the signing of charter creating Queen's College in 1766 by New Jersey's last royal governor, William Franklin. According to Star-Ledger columnist Mark DiIonno, the "Charter Window" was donated by Frelinghuysen family to commemorate the 175th anniversary of the signing, and dedicated to their ancestor the Rev. Theodorus Jacobus Frelinghuysen (1692–1747)—an early advocate for establishing the college—and his sons Rev. Theodorus Jacobus Frelinghuysen II (1724–c.1760) and Rev. John Frelinghuysen (1727–1754). (Note: Despite DiIonno's article mentioning only the elder Rev. Frelinghuysen, the inscription at the bottom of the Charter Window states that it was given "In Memory of Theodorus Jacobus Frelinghuysen and his sons Theodorus Frelinghuysen, John Frelinghuysen." (See:File:Kirkpatrick Chapel 1766 Rutgers Charter Window New Brunswick NJ.jpg)) Rev. Frelinghuysen, his sons, and Rev. Hardenbergh were instrumental raising funds and political support for establishing the college.

The windows of Kirkpatrick chapel underwent an eleven-year restoration beginning in 2004 with the chapel's clerestory windows under the direction of Michael Padovan and his studio Jersey Art Stained Glass in Frenchtown, New Jersey.

=== Portraits and memorial plaques ===
An alumnus and local attorney, Edward Sullivan Vail (1819–1889), a graduate from the class of 1839, is listed in University publications as "Collector of Portraits for Kirkpatrick Chapel", after spearheading the effort to collecting over sixty paintings portraying Rutgers presidents, prominent trustees, professors and the chapel's namesake, Sophia Astley Kirkpatrick. Kirkpatrick, whose portrait was painted by an American artist named G. Bruecke, is the only woman among the collection. The earliest portraits date to the eighteenth century.

The walls inside Kirkpatrick Chapel are adorned with memorial plaques recording the names of Rutgers graduates who died in war. In 1966, Richard P. McCormick wrote that the names of 234 men and two women associated with Rutgers who died "in the line of duty" are inscribed in the chapel's Service Book and that a number of "Gold Star scholarships" were established by the Alumni Association as a tribute. This number of alumni killed in action has increased since McCormick's tabulation was published before the conclusion of the Vietnam War (1961–1975). Several more Rutgers alumni were killed in Vietnam after McCormick's 1966 tabulation, and during the recent conflicts in the Middle East (2001–present).
