= Philip Brett (disambiguation) =

Philip Brett (1937–2002) was a British-born American musicologist.

Philip or Phillip Brett may also refer to:

- Philip Brett (cricketer) (1816–1872), English cricketer
- Philip Milledoler Brett (1871–1960), thirteenth President of Rutgers University
- Phillip Brett (born 1991 or 1992), Unionist politician from Northern Ireland
