= Austin Scott (historian) =

American educator (1848–1922)

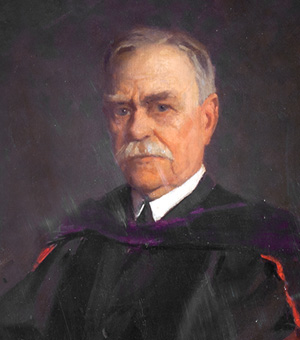

48th Mayor of New Brunswick, New Jersey
- In office 1914 (Note: Other sources say 1912.)–1915
- Preceded by: John J. Morrison
- Succeeded by: Edward Farrington

10th President of Rutgers University
- In office 1891–1906
- Preceded by: Merrill Edward Gates
- Succeeded by: William H. S. Demarest

Personal details
- Born: Frank Austin Scott; August 10, 1848; Toledo, Ohio, U.S.
- Died: August 15, 1922 (aged 74); Granville, Massachusetts, U.S.
- Spouse: Anna Prentiss Stearns
- Parent(s): Jeremiah Austin Scott; Sarah Remey
- Education: Yale College (A.B.); University of Michigan (M.A.); University of Berlin; University of Leipzig (Ph.D.)

Frank Austin Scott (August 10, 1848 – August 15, 1922) was the tenth president of Rutgers College (now Rutgers University), serving from 1891 to 1906.

== Biography ==
Scott was born in Toledo, Ohio, to Jeremiah Austin Scott and Sarah Remey. His birth name was Frank Austin Scott, but he eventually dropped the use of his first name.

Scott received a baccalaureate degree from Yale College in 1869 and earned a Master of Arts (M.A.) from the University of Michigan in 1870.

Scott studied at the University of Berlin and the University of Leipzig, receiving a Doctor of Philosophy (Ph.D.) from Leipzig in 1873. After completing his studies in Germany, Scott taught at the University of Michigan and at Johns Hopkins University, as well as continuing work with historian George Bancroft that had begun during his time in Germany. He had worked with Bancroft in Germany on the tenth volume of his History of the United States and upon his return worked with him on his History of the United States Constitution. According to historian Hugh Hawkins, Scott preferred teaching at Hopkins to his work with Bancroft. He wanted to become a full-time instructor at Hopkins, and offered to end all other obligations, but left Hopkins in 1882 after he was not granted full-time status. The reason he was not promoted may have had more to do with Herbert Baxter Adams than Scott's own abilities. Adams possessed "unlimited ambition and great adroitness," and Adams gained a full-time appointment while Scott did not.

In 1882, Scott married Anna Prentiss Stearns and they had seven children.

In 1883, Scott was appointed to the faculty of Rutgers College as a professor of history, political economy, and constitutional law, and was elected to succeed Merrill Edward Gates in 1891.

During Scott's tenure at Rutgers, Robert Francis Ballantine (1836–1905), a wealthy brewer from Newark, New Jersey and a college trustee, made a substantial contribution to be used for the construction of a gymnasium on the campus. To replace the overcrowded library in the Kirkpatrick Chapel, Ralph and Elizabeth Rodman Voorhees made a major donation in 1873 to be used to build a new library. After Scott resigned as president in 1906, he returned to the faculty, spending 16 years teaching political science, constitutional law, international law and civics, in addition to assisting his successor, William H. S. Demarest, with administrative functions.

Scott served as the mayor of New Brunswick, New Jersey, from 1914 to 1915. He died in Granville, Massachusetts, in 1922 at his summer home. His widow died on January 23, 1933.

== Notes ==
Academic offices
Preceded by Merrill Edward Gates	President of Rutgers University; 1891–1906	Succeeded by William H. S. Demarest
Political offices
Preceded by John J. Morrison	Mayor of New Brunswick, New Jersey; 1914–1915	Succeeded by Edward Farrington
