= List of presidents of Rutgers University =

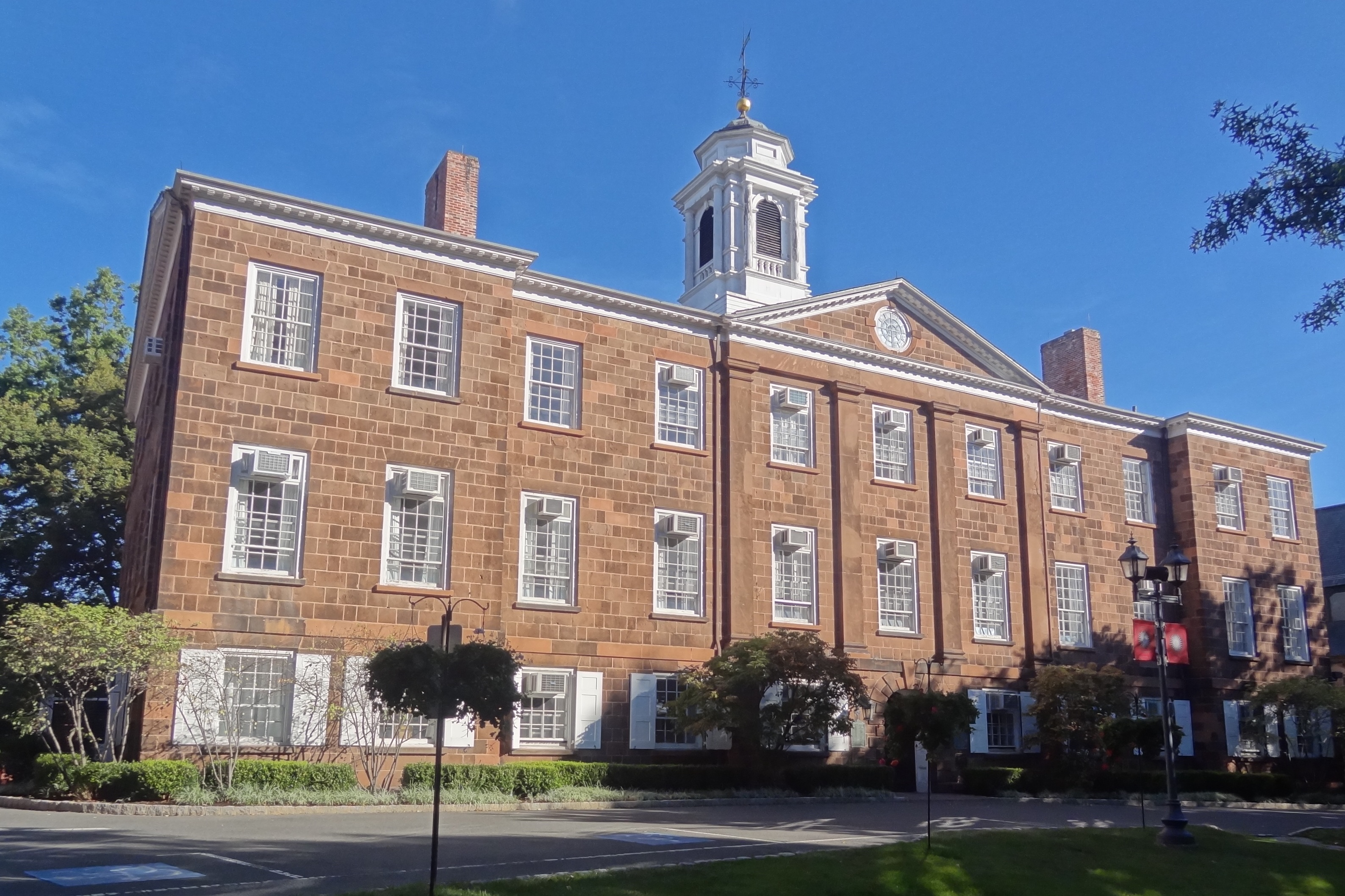
Old Queens, built 1809–1823, is the oldest building on the Rutgers University campus. In its early days, it housed the school's students and classrooms. Today, it is home to the university's administration.

The president of Rutgers, The State University of New Jersey (informally called Rutgers University) /ˈrʌtɡərz/ is the chief administrator of Rutgers, The State University of New Jersey. Rutgers was founded by clergymen affiliated with the Dutch Reformed Church in 1766 as Queen's College and was the eighth-oldest of nine colleges established during the American colonial period. Before 1956, Rutgers was a small liberal arts college and became a full university in 1924 with the offering of graduate degree programs and the establishment of professional schools. Today, Rutgers is a public research university with three campuses in the state located in New Brunswick and Piscataway, Newark, and Camden. The state's flagship university with approximately 65,000 students and employing 20,000 faculty and staff members, Rutgers is the largest institution for higher education in New Jersey.

Since 1785, twenty-two men have served as the institution's president, beginning with the Reverend Jacob Rutsen Hardenbergh, a Dutch Reformed clergyman who was responsible for establishing the college. Before 1930, most of the university's presidents were clergymen affiliated with Christian denominations in the Reformed tradition (either Dutch or German Reformed, or Presbyterian). Two presidents were alumni of Rutgers College—the Rev. William H. S. Demarest (Class of 1883) and Philip Milledoler Brett (Class of 1892). The current president William F. Tate IV, who became the university's twenty-second president on July 1, 2025 succeeding Jonathan Holloway. Jonathan Holloway, who is African American, was the first person of color to lead Rutgers University and took office July 1, 2020 and served till June 30, 2025.

The president serves in an ex officio capacity as a presiding officer within the university's 59-member board of trustees and its eleven-member board of governors, and is appointed by these boards to oversee day-to-day operations of the university across its three campuses. He is charged with implementing "board policies with the help and advice of senior administrators and other members of the university community." The president is responsible only to those two governing boards—there is no oversight by state officials. Frequently, the president also occupies a professorship in his academic discipline and engages in instructing students.

== Presidents of Rutgers University ==
The following twenty-two individuals have served as president of Rutgers University from the creation of the office in 1785 to the present. Those marked with their names in bold had graduated from Rutgers. Those marked with "↑" died in office. Where years don't overlap there was a gap of a few months while a suitable candidate was found, this usually occurred when someone died in office, or left unexpectedly to accept another position.

=== Presidents of Queen's College (1785–1825) ===
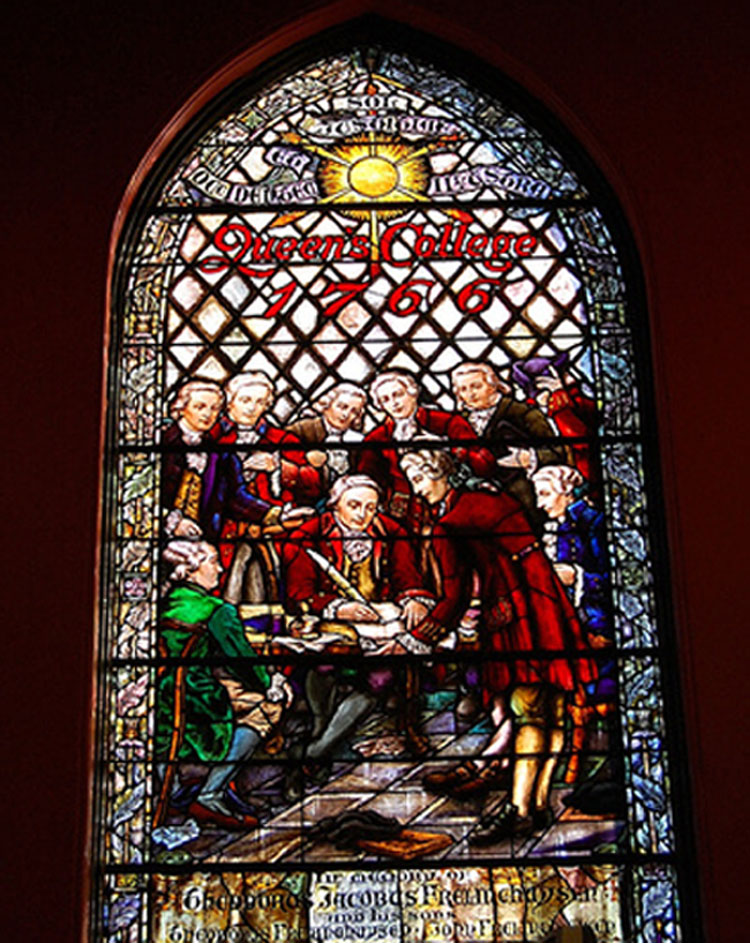
A stained-glass window in Kirkpatrick Chapel, given by the Frelinghuysen family, depicts the signing of the Queen's College charter in 1766.

Rutgers was founded as Queen's College on November 10, 1766, and is the eighth-oldest college in the United States and one of the nine Colonial Colleges founded before the American Revolution. The university is one of only two colonial colleges that later became public universities. (Note: The other colonial college—the College of William & Mary in Williamsburg, Virginia—became a state institution by acts of the Virginia legislature in 1888 and 1906.)

In the early days of Queen's College, the trustees wrote to the church's leadership in Amsterdam and at the University of Utrecht to seek candidates for the position of president. In their correspondence, they expressed a wish that a prospective college president possess the following characteristics:

- (1) he was to fill the office of professor of theology,
- (2) to oversee the instruction in languages through tutors until professors could be secured,
- (3) to do more or less the work of a minister on the Lord's Day,
- (4) to be a man of tried piety,
- (5) to be attached to the Constitution of the Netherlands Church,
- (6) to be a man of thorough learning,
- (7) to be good natured,
- (8) to be free and friendly in conversation,
- (9) to be master of the English language, and
- (10) to be pleased to lecture on Marckii Medulla Theologiae Christianae. (Note: This would be the Johannis Marckii Christianae Theologiae Medulla Didactico-Elenetica, an exegetic and pedagogic work on Dutch Reformed theology written by Johannes van Marck (1655–1731), professor of divinity at Leiden University (1689–1731), and revised by Willem van Irhoven (1698–1760), a professor of theology and later Rector of the University of Utrecht. First published in 1719 in Latin, the title can be rendered from Latin into English as "Johannes van Marck's The Inner Substance (or Pith or Marrow) of Christian Theology.)

Its early history, Rutgers was closely allied with the Dutch Reformed Synod of New York which oversaw financial transactions and early selections of professors for Queen's College and the New Brunswick Theological Seminary. The Rev. John Henry Livingston (1746–1825), who served as the college's fourth president and was responsible for establishing the New Brunswick Theological Seminary, was instrumental in raising funds to support the school after several years of being closed resulting from economic difficulties. Just before his death, Livingston raised enough donations and support to place the school on more stable financial footing, including arranging for a generous donation in 1825 from Colonel Henry Rutgers (1745–1830), a wealthy landowner and former Revolutionary War officer from New York City. The trustees of the school renamed the school in honour of Colonel Rutgers in that year.

=== List of presidents ===
The following persons have served as president of Rutgers:

No.	Portrait	Name	Term start	Term end	Ref.
**Presidents of Queen's College (1785–1825)**
1		Jacob Rutsen Hardenbergh (1735–1790)	1786	October 30, 1790 (Note: Died in office)↑	
2 pro tem		William Linn (Note: Served as president during a time of financial trouble.) (1752–1808)	1791	1795	
3 pro tem		Ira Condict (Note: Appointed president while college was closed 1795 to 1807. After difficult fundraising effort, Queen's College reopened in 1807) (1764–1811)	1795	1810	
4		John Henry Livingston (Note: As president, college closed due to financial problems from 1816 to 1825, during this time he raised funds and support to reopen the school.) (1746–1825)	1810	January 25, 1825↑	
**Presidents of Rutgers College (1825–1924)**
5		Philip Milledoler (1775–1852)	1825	1840	
6		Abraham Bruyn Hasbrouck (1791–1879)	1840	1850	
7		Theodore Frelinghuysen (1787–1862)	1850	April 12, 1862↑	
8		William Henry Campbell (1808–1890)	1862	1882	
9		Merrill Edwards Gates (1848–1922)	1882	1890 (Note: Resigned to lead Amherst College.)	
10		Austin Scott (1848–1922)	1891	1906	
11		William Henry Steele Demarest (1863–1956)	1906	1924	
**Presidents of Rutgers University (1924–1945)**
12		John Martin Thomas (1869–1952)	1925	1930	
13 acting		**Philip Milledoler Brett** (1871–1960)	1930	1931	
14		Robert Clarkson Clothier (1885–1970)	1932	1951	
**Presidents of Rutgers, The State University of New Jersey (1945–present)**
15		Lewis Webster Jones (1899–1975)	1951	1958	
16		Mason Welch Gross (1911–1977)	1959	August 31, 1971	
17		Edward J. Bloustein (1925–1989)	September 1, 1971	December 9, 1989↑	
acting		T. Alexander Pond (1924–2010)	December 1989	October 1990	
18		Francis Leo Lawrence (1937–2013)	October 1990	November 30, 2002	
19		Richard Levis McCormick (born 1947)	December 1, 2002	June 30, 2012	
interim		Richard L. Edwards	July 1, 2012	August 31, 2012	
20		Robert Lawrence Barchi (born 1946)	September 1, 2012	June 30, 2020	
21		Jonathan Scott Holloway (born 1967)	July 1, 2020	June 30, 2025 (Note: Resigned to lead the Henry Luce Foundation)	
22	Portrait of William F. Tate IV	William F. Tate IV	July 1, 2025	present	

Table notes:
