= Philip Milledoler =

American Presbyterian and Dutch Reformed minister

The Reverend Philip Milledoler
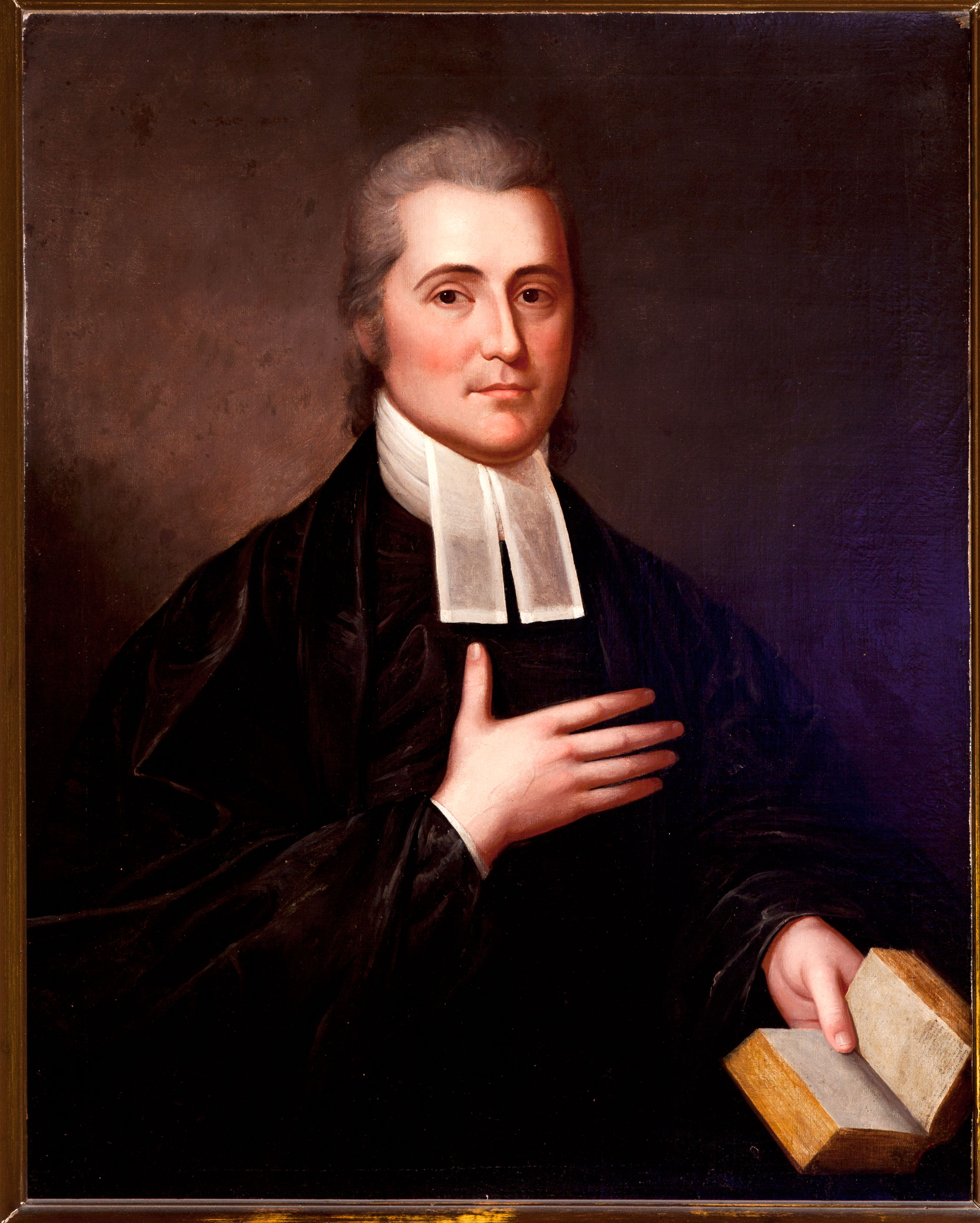

5th President of Rutgers University
- In office 1825–1840
- Preceded by: John Henry Livingston
- Succeeded by: Abraham Bruyn Hasbrouck

Personal details
- Born: September 22, 1775 Rhinebeck, New York
- Died: September 22, 1852 (aged 77) Staten Island, New York

Philip Milledoler (September 22, 1775 – September 22, 1852) was an American Presbyterian and Dutch Reformed minister and the fifth President of Rutgers College (now Rutgers University) serving from 1825 until 1840.

== Biography ==
Philip Milledoler was born in 1775 in Rhinebeck, New York. His father had emigrated to the United States from Switzerland in 1751.

He graduated from Columbia College with a Bachelor of Arts (A.B.) in 1793 and was ordained into the ministry by the German Reformed Synod in Reading, Pennsylvania on May 17, 1794. He served churches in both the Presbyterian and Dutch Reformed faiths.

He married Susannah Benson and had a daughter, Susan Ann Milledoler (c1790-1867), who married Martin Wiltsie Brett (1788–1879) in 1816. Susan was the great-grandmother of Philip Milledoler Brett.

Milledoler was active in forming the Princeton Theological Seminary, the American Bible Society, and the United Foreign Missionary Society. In 1825, he accepted the presidency of Queen's College after the death of John Henry Livingston, and convinced one of his parishioners in New York City, Colonel Henry Rutgers, a wealthy bachelor, to donate $5,000 to the college, creating a drive to reopen the closed institution. The Board of Trustees named the institution after Colonel Rutgers, and Rutgers College was reopened on 14 November 1825.

Reverend Milledoler was responsible for reorganizing the curriculum of Rutgers College into one that instructed in the liberal arts, offering courses in Greek and Latin, mathematics, philosophy, literature, political economy, and later lectures in geology, mineralogy and chemistry. During this time, enrollment at Rutgers College increased, and the college became more independent of the Dutch Reformed Church. This increased dissension between the Church and the college and prompted Reverend Milledoler to resign in 1839, remaining on the post until the Trustees selected a replacement in 1840. That same year, he was elected a member of the American Philosophical Society.

He died on his birthday, 22 September 1852, while living at the home of his son-in-law, James William Beekman (1815–1877) on Staten Island.

== Publication ==
- Dissertation on Incestuous Marriages (1843)

== See also ==
- Philip Milledoler Brett

Academic offices
| Preceded by John Henry Livingston | President of Rutgers University; 1825–1840 | Succeeded by Abraham Bruyn Hasbrouck |
