= New Jersey Hall =

- U.S. National Register of Historic Places
- New Jersey Register of Historic Places
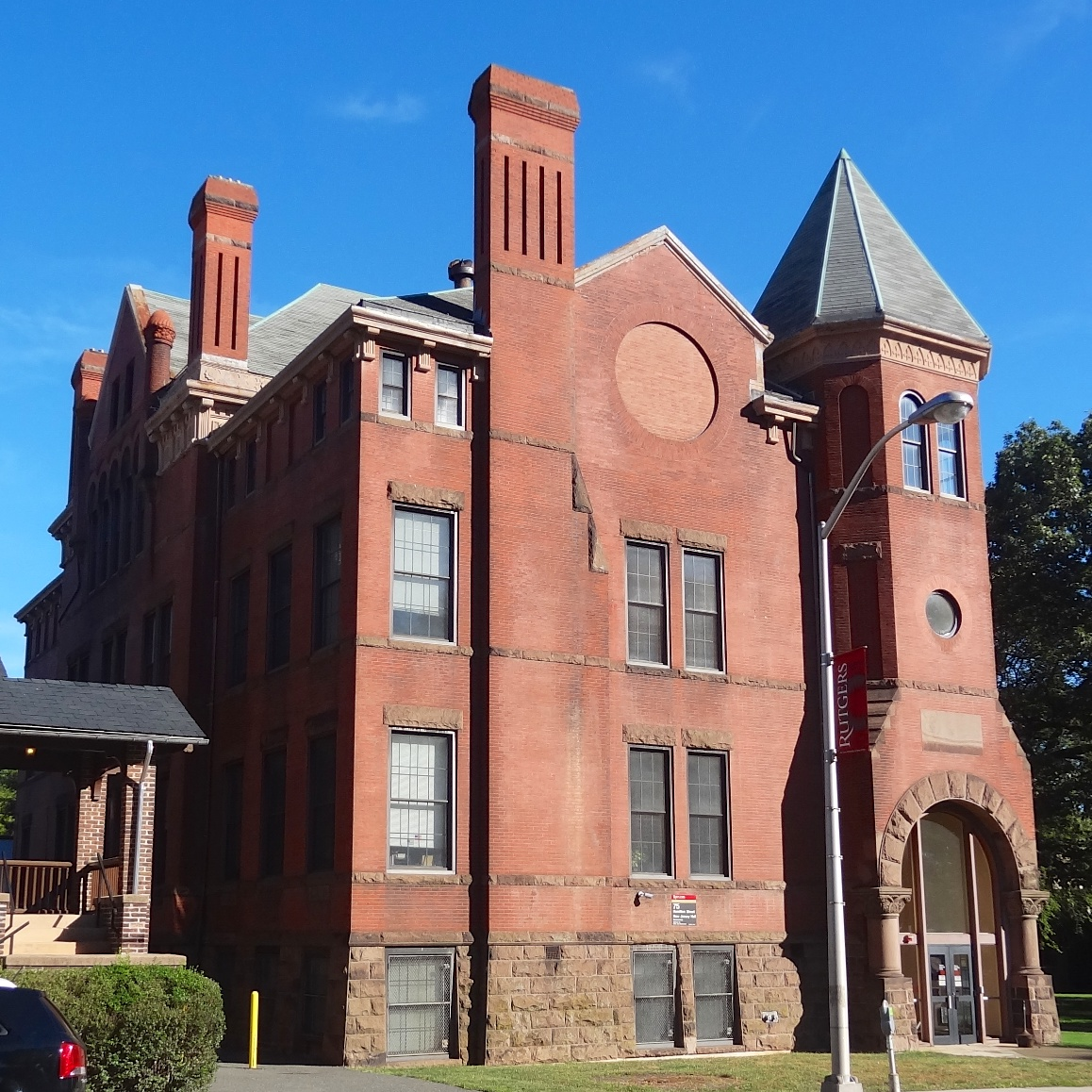

- Location within Middlesex County, New Jersey Location within New Jersey Location within the United States
- Location: 75 Hamilton Street; New Brunswick, New Jersey 08901
- Coordinates: 40°29′58″N 74°26′51″W
- Built: 1889
- Architect: George K. Parsell
- Architectural style: Romanesque, Richardsonian Romanesque
- NRHP reference No.: 75001144
- NJRHP No.: 1876

Significant dates
- Added to NRHP: February 24, 1975
- Designated NJRHP: June 5, 1974

New Jersey Hall is a historic education building located on the campus of Rutgers University in New Brunswick, New Jersey. Built in 1889 under the leadership of President Merrill Edward Gates, it housed the Agricultural Experiment Station. It was added to the National Register of Historic Places on February 24, 1975, for its significance in agriculture and education. Today, the building houses the university's Department of Economics.

== Summary ==
New Jersey Hall was built in 1889 by architect George K. Parsell. The plot of land it is on was given to Rutgers by James Neilson Jr. The building's construction was funded by the Hatch Act of 1887, which was passed with the purpose of implementing and conducting agricultural research programs. Prior to the Hatch Act of 1887, the Morrill Land Grant Act of 1862 paved the way for a greater focus on agriculture and mechanical arts in higher education. When Rutgers was declared the land-grant college of New Jersey, it opened opportunities for innovation and expansion. George H. Cook was the primary advocate for Rutgers to be chosen as the land-grant college of New Jersey and was also the first director of the New Jersey Agricultural Experiment Station which was originally housed in New Jersey Hall. The building also initially housed the college's departments of Chemistry and Biology. Today, New Jersey Hall houses the university's Department of Economics and the New Jersey Bureau of Economic Research. It is primarily an office building for professors and graduate students.

== Architecture ==
New Jersey Hall was built by architect George K. Parsell in 1889. It is a mixture of Queen Anne and Richardsonian Romanesque. The outside of the building is made of cut stone. It is three stories high and rests on the foundation of the building which is a high basement. There are two entrances to the building, one on the side of Voorhees Mall and one faces Hamilton Street. Stone arches, supported by Romanesque columns with capitals, mark both sides of the entranceways.

In 1903 there was a fire that destroyed a large portion of the roof and third story. The damaged areas were rebuilt to maintain the original design. Since then some slight renovations and repairs have been done, but the building maintains its historic integrity.

== Legislation ==
The Morrill Act of 1862 gave New Jersey a land script of 210,000 acres of public land in the west. This land was originally that of the Lenni Lenape, who were never compensated. The profits received from the sale of this land to private individuals, allowed New Jersey to fund departments in agriculture and mechanical arts. Rutgers University was chosen as the college to receive these funds and be declared the land-grant college of New Jersey. This shifted higher education to focus on the sciences and allowed low-income and disadvantaged New Jersey residents to receive a formal education.

The Hatch of 1887 allowed for the New Jersey government to give Rutgers an annual subsidy of $15,000, which enabled the establishment of the New Jersey Agricultural Experiment Station. On May 11, 1888, plans and funds were excepted by the Rutgers Board of Trustees to build New Jersey Hall, in order to house the NJAES as well as new laboratories.

== Educational use ==
New Jersey Hall was home to the chemistry and biology departments of Rutgers college. Students were given more space to conduct research and experiments, specifically on agricultural and mechanical arts. Advances in the use of fertilizers, as well as insecticides, were made. These experiments also enabled chemists to act as an official food and drug administration for New Jersey residents at the time.
