= Kathleen Hagerty =

American lecturer and professor of finance

Provost of Northwestern University
- In office September 1, 2020 – June 30, 2026
- Preceded by: Jonathan Holloway

Personal details
- Education: University of California, Berkeley (BA, MS, MBA); Stanford University (PhD)

Kathleen M. Hagerty is an American academic who served as the provost of Northwestern University from 2020 through 2026. Prior to that, she was dean of the faculty in the Kellogg School of Management. She is the first woman provost of the university.

== Education ==
Hagerty earned her B.A. in mathematics at the University of California, Berkeley in 1975, her M.S. in operations research at Berkeley in 1977, and her M.B.A. in finance at Berkeley in 1979. She was awarded her Ph.D. in economics at Stanford University in 1985.

== Career ==
Hagerty has worked for more than 30 years at the Kellogg School of Management previously and holds a Professorship of Finance, focusing her research on the field of disclosure regulations, micro structure of security marketing, and insider trading regulations.

In October 2025, Northwestern University announced that Provost Kathleen Hagerty would step down by the end of the academic year.
