= Andover Review =

- Discipline: Theology, Biblical studies
- Language: English

Publication details
- History: 1884–1893
- Publisher: Andover Theological Seminary, Houghton Mifflin (United States)

Standard abbreviations
- ISO 4: Andover Rev.

The Andover Review was a United States religious and theological periodical published from 1884 to 1893. It defined itself as standing for "thoroughly progressive orthodoxy," and was contributed to primarily from the ranks of the faculty of Andover Theological Seminary. Originally published monthly, it changed to bi-monthly format for its last year of publication.

After Bibliotheca Sacra moved its publishing quarters to Oberlin, Ohio, the faculty at the Andover Theological Seminary began publishing its new journal, called the Andover Review. The first issue is considered the most important. In it, the guideline of the journal was set—that of a more liberal and modern view toward religion. It was this leaning toward liberalism which later led to the "Andover trials". These trials, more than the excellence of the magazine itself, gained for the review its greatest fame. It was not long after the trials ended that the review ceased publication. In the review, readers may trace the advance of the church from the older Calvinism to the more modern religious views.

== Contributors ==
- John Dewey
- George Harris
- Ezra Palmer Gould
