= George Harris (theologian) =

American theologian (1844–1922)

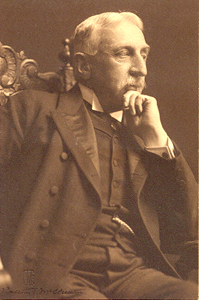
- Born: April 1, 1844; Machias
- Died: March 1, 1922 (aged 77); New York City
- Resting place: Swan Point Cemetery
- Alma mater: Amherst College; Andover Newton Theological School
- Occupation: Cleric; teacher
- Employer: High Street Church; Central Congregational Church; Andover Theological Seminary; Amherst College
- Position held: president (1899–1912)

George Harris Jr. (April 1, 1844 – March 1, 1922) was an American minister, academic, and college president.

== Early life and education ==
He was born at East Machias, Maine to George Harris Sr. and Mary Ann Palmer. He attended Washington Academy and graduated from Amherst College in 1866 and from Andover Theological Seminary in 1869. He received the D.D. degree from Harvard, Yale and Amherst, and the LL.D. degree from Dartmouth and Williams.

== Career ==
He was minister of High Street Church in Auburn, Maine from 1869 to 1872, and of the Central Congregational Church in Providence, Rhode Island from 1872 to 1883. From 1883 to 1899, he was professor of Christian theology at Andover Theological Seminary and from 1899 to 1911, president of Amherst College.

He spoke at the Commencement of Wheaton College in Massachusetts in 1872.

He is author of Moral Evolution, (1896) and Inequality and Progress, (1897). He was one of the editors of the Andover Review from 1884 to 1893.

He was married on December 24, 1873, in Providence, Rhode Island to Jane Anthony Viall, and they had one son.

Academic offices
| Preceded by Merrill Edward Gates | President of Amherst College; 1899–1912 | Succeeded by Alexander Meiklejohn |
