= New Jersey Agricultural Experiment Station =

Entity operated by Rutgers University

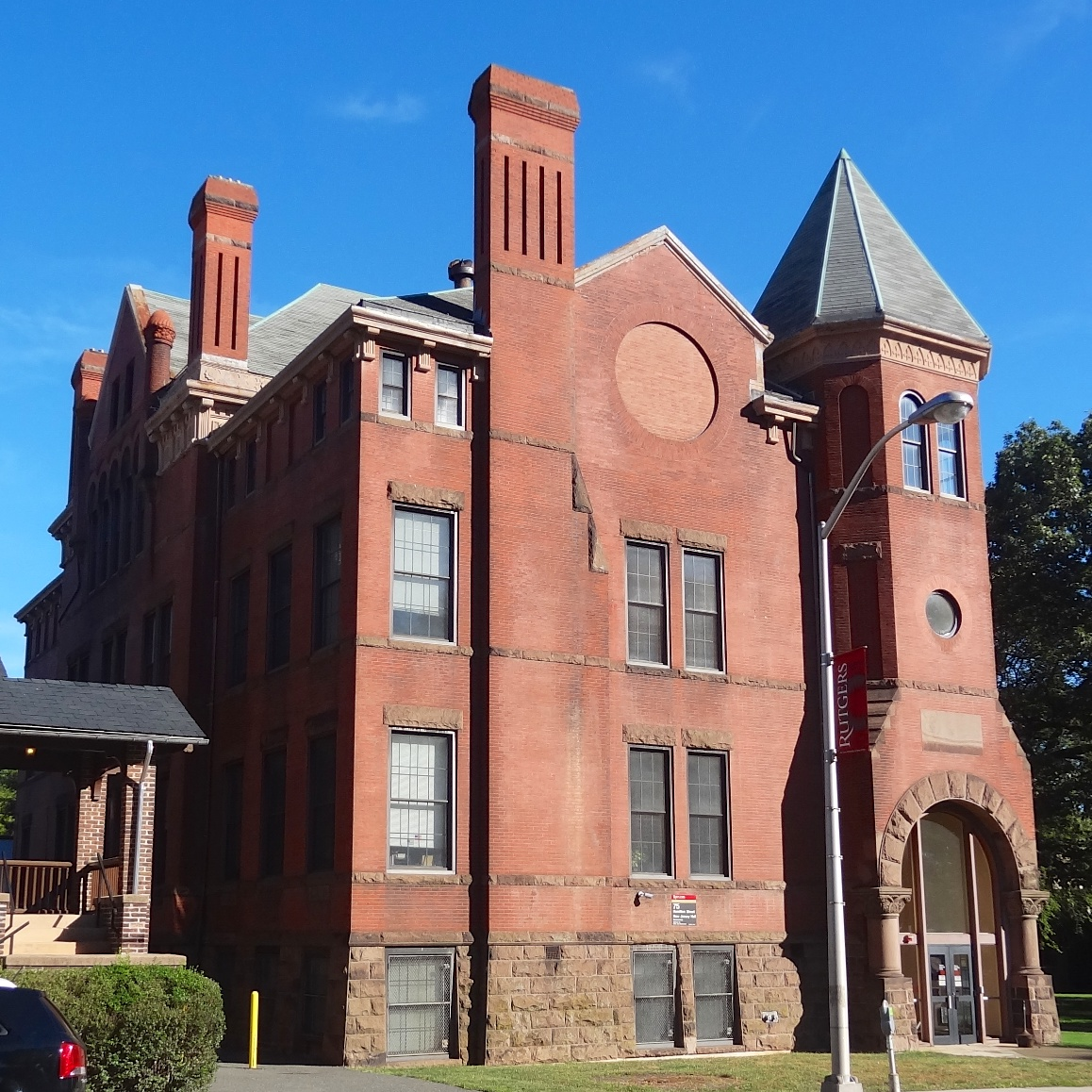
New Jersey Hall, located on Voorhees Mall on Rutgers' College Avenue Campus, was built in 1889 to house the Agricultural Experiment Station.

The New Jersey Agricultural Experiment Station (or NJAES) is an entity currently operated by Rutgers, The State University of New Jersey in conjunction with the State of New Jersey in the university's role as the state's sole land-grant university. Today, it conducts research in agriculture, horticulture and turf grass science, and through the Rutgers Cooperative Extension aids New Jersey farmers, landscapers, and residents in each of the state's twenty-one counties.

== History ==
In 1864 the State of New Jersey named Rutgers College as their sole land grant college. Pursuant to the Morrill Act of 1862, this designation gave federal lands to the state that the state could then sell to raise money to develop practical education in agriculture, science, military science and engineering. George Hammell Cook (1818-1889), a professor of chemistry and natural sciences, influenced the state to select Rutgers over the College of New Jersey (now Princeton University). Cook was appointed state geologist in 1864 and later became the college's vice president. With the college's land grant status and new funding for scientific studies, Cook expanded his research and teaching into geology and agriculture.

The Agricultural Experiment Station began with agriculture instruction in the college's Geology Hall, built in 1872, until New Jersey Hall was built in 1889. The New Jersey state legislature provided funds to construct an "Agricultural Hall" to house the station, and Rutgers built the Richard Romanesque style building in 1889. The university operated the station from that facility and through its college farm located on what became the college's Cook Campus where it remains today at 102 Ryders Lane in North Brunswick, New Jersey.

Through the station's Office of Continuing Professional Education (OCPE), the NJAES provides continuing education programmes to residents and professionals throughout the state of New Jersey. OCPE offers courses in topic areas like Wetlands preservation, Professional Golf Course Turf Management, Food Science, Food Safety, Public Health and Safety, Landscape construction and architecture, environmental sciences, and recycling. The station aims to increase coursework and research in planned agricultural production and competitiveness; food science and engineering; nutrition, health and safety; marine and coastal resources; natural resources and the environment; and human and community resource development.
