= Daniel I. Linzer =

Daniel Linzer

Provost of Northwestern University
- In office September 1, 2007 – August 1, 2017
- Preceded by: Lawrence Dumas
- Succeeded by: Jonathan Holloway

Personal details
- Born: 1954 (age 71–72)
- Education: Yale University (BA); Princeton University (PhD)
- Known for: signal transduction
- Scientific career
- Fields: molecular biology
- Workplaces: Northwestern University

Daniel I. H. Linzer (born 1954) is an American molecular biologist and academic administrator. Linzer was named provost of Northwestern University on September 1, 2007, until 2017 having previously served as Dean (2002–2007) and Associate Dean (1998–2002) of Northwestern's largest constituent school, the Weinberg College of Arts and Sciences.

Linzer received his bachelor's degree in molecular biophysics and biochemistry from Yale University in 1976, a PhD in biochemical science from Princeton University in 1980, and a National Institutes of Health postdoctoral fellowship at the Johns Hopkins University School of Medicine. He joined Northwestern in 1984 as an assistant professor, and remains a professor of biochemistry, molecular biology and cell biology. He has conducted research on the molecular basis of hormone action and signal transduction. Linzer has been awarded the Searle Scholars Award and the American Cancer Society Faculty Research Award. Daniel Linzer became the president of Research Corporation for Science Advancement (RCSA) on October 1, 2017.

Linzer resides in Evanston, Illinois.
