= Jonathan Holloway (historian) =

American historian (born 1967)

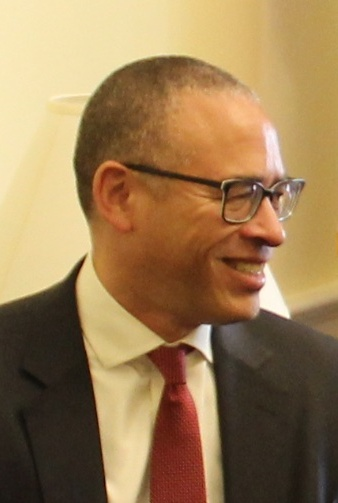
- Holloway in 2023

21st President of Rutgers University
- In office July 1, 2020 – June 30, 2025
- Preceded by: Robert Barchi
- Succeeded by: William F. Tate IV

Provost of Northwestern University
- In office August 1, 2017 – July 1, 2020
- Preceded by: Daniel I. Linzer
- Succeeded by: Kathleen Hagerty

Dean of Yale College
- In office July 1, 2014 – July 1, 2017
- Preceded by: Mary Miller
- Succeeded by: Marvin Chun

Personal details
- Born: Jonathan Scott Holloway; 1967 (age 58–59) Hawaii, U.S.
- Relatives: Brian Holloway (brother)
- Education: Stanford University (BA); Yale University (MA, PhD)

Academic background
- Thesis: Confronting the Veil: New Deal African-American Intellectuals and the Evolution of a Radical Voice (1995)
- Doctoral advisor: David Montgomery

Academic work
- Discipline: History
- Institutions: University of California, San Diego; Calhoun College; Yale University; Northwestern University; Rutgers University

Jonathan Scott Holloway (born 1967) is an American historian and academic administrator who served as the 21st president of Rutgers University.

Holloway was named as the president of Rutgers University in January 2020 becoming the first person of color and first African American to be named president of Rutgers. He assumed the position on July 1, 2020. Before coming to Rutgers, he was the provost of Northwestern University, a position he held between August 1, 2017, and July 1, 2020. Before that, he was the dean of Yale College and Edmund S. Morgan Professor of African American Studies, History, and American Studies at Yale University. During his tenure as Rutgers president, he oversaw the response to the 2023 Rutgers University strike. In an email to students on September 17, 2024, Holloway announced his resignation, stating that the 2024–2025 academic year will be his final year as university president and he would not seek a contract extension. He was then named the head of the Henry Luce Foundation.

== Early life and education ==
Holloway was born in Hawaii and raised on military bases in Montgomery, Alabama and Maryland while his father served in the United States Air Force. He was a star football player at Winston Churchill High School in Potomac, Maryland, and he was named an All-American honorable mention by USA Today.

Holloway was recruited to play linebacker at Stanford University but graduated in 1989 without starting a game. While on Stanford's football team, he was a teammate of future U.S. Senator Cory Booker. He earned a Bachelor of Arts in American studies. Holloway earned a Ph.D. in history from Yale University in 1995.

== Academic career ==
He began his academic career at the University of California, San Diego, before returning to Yale and joining its faculty in 1999. He became a full professor there in 2004.

Holloway was appointed Master (now known as "Head") of Calhoun College (now known as Grace Hopper College) in 2005, and chaired the governing body of Yale's residential colleges, the Council of Masters, from 2009 to 2014. As a Master, Holloway was respected for his approachability, charisma, and involvement in student life. For several years, he opposed the change of name of Calhoun, despite student demands, and noted the irony of his serving as the Master of that college; but he changed his mind as many students became more vocal in their opposition to the name in 2015. He was considered a candidate for dean of Yale College in 2008, though Mary Miller was eventually appointed. He was appointed as her successor in May 2014 by Yale President Peter Salovey, making him Yale's first black dean.

During the protests regarding Halloween costumes at Yale in November 2015, while he was dean, Holloway strongly supported the costume guidelines issued by his office (guidelines which some critics saw as unnecessary), calling them "exactly right." Holloway is a supporter of affirmative action programs and reparations (albeit not cash transfers).

Holloway left Yale and became provost of Northwestern University on August 1, 2017.

Holloway is the author of Confronting the Veil: Abram Harris Jr., E. Franklin Frazier, and Ralph Bunche, 1919-1941 (2002) and Jim Crow Wisdom: Memory and Identity in Black America Since 1940 (2013), both published by the University of North Carolina Press. He also wrote The Cause of Freedom: A Concise History of African Americans (2021) and African American History: A Very Short Introduction (2023), both with Oxford University Press. He edited Ralph Bunche's A Brief and Tentative Analysis of Negro Leadership (NYU Press, 2005) and co-edited Black Scholars on the Line: Race, Social Science, and American Thought in the 20th Century (University of Notre Dame Press, 2007). He wrote an introduction for a new edition of W.E.B. Du Bois's Souls of Black Folk, published by Yale University Press in 2015.

=== Rutgers University ===
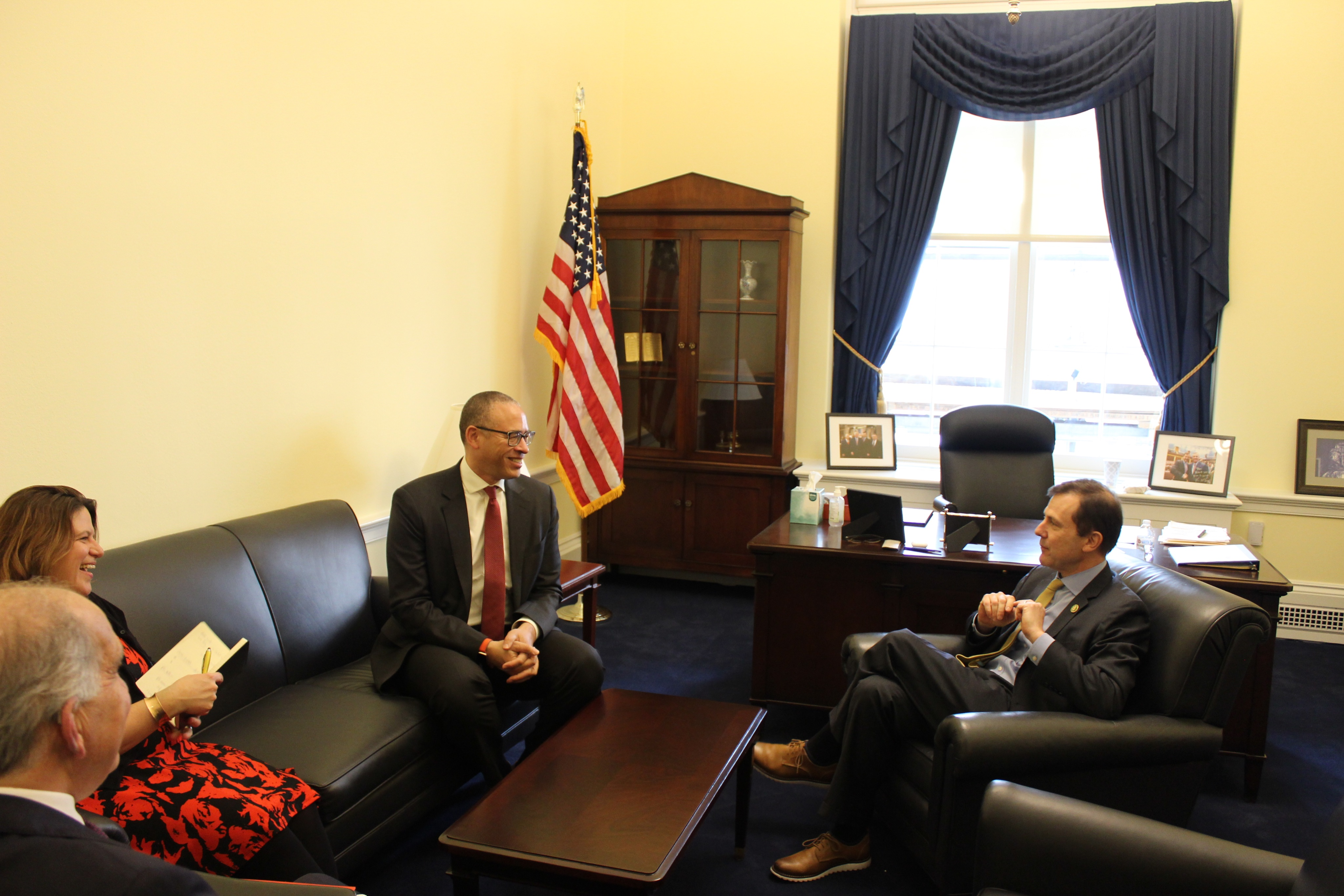
Holloway with Thomas Kean Jr. in February 2023

On January 21, 2020, Rutgers University announced that Holloway has been selected as the university's twenty-first president. He assumed the position on July 1, 2020, following the resignation of the university's previous president Dr. Robert L. Barchi. Holloway is Rutgers' first Black president.

At Rutgers, Holloway endorsed a climate goal to achieve carbon neutrality by 2040, established a public service-focused summer internship program, and commissioned a diversity strategic plan. In his first year, Holloway championed a fundraising drive that generated $10 million in private donations for student financial assistance; a year later, he expanded the initiative and set a target of raising $50 million by the end of 2024.

On April 9, 2023, three unions voted to go on the first strike by academics in the university's 257-year history, citing the lack of progress on contract talks between union representatives and university officials. As a result, classes and research were suspended. Holloway opposed the strike and claimed during negotiations that strikes by public workers are illegal in New Jersey. These claims were disputed by several scholars, and the legality of public worker strikes in the state remains unclear.

On September 22, 2023, the Rutgers senate passed a motion of no confidence in Holloway's leadership. The vote was 89–47 and came after several unpopular actions by Holloway, including not renewing the contract of Nancy Cantor, the popular chancellor of the school’s Newark campus, and threatening to file an injunction against Rutgers faculty during its strike.

On September 17, 2024, Holloway announced that the 2024-2025 academic year would be his final year serving as university president. Although he may be leaving, Holloway says, "There is plenty to do before I leave office on June 30, and I remain focused on that work... Above all, I remain steadfast in my belief that Rutgers is on the rise and is earning the respect it has long deserved. I look forward to seeing it flourish in the years ahead." Holloway was replaced by William F. Tate IV July 1, 2025.

On May 23, 2024, Holloway testified before the House Committee on Education and the Workforce regarding antisemitism in higher education.

On April 4, 2025, the Henry Luce Foundation announced that Holloway would become its seventh president and CEO, effective October 1, 2025; he currently serves as the foundation's president and CEO.

== Personal life ==
Holloway is married to Aisling Colón, and they have two children. His older brother Brian Holloway played professional football in the NFL.

== Publications ==
=== Books ===
- Holloway, Jonathan Scott (2002). Confronting the Veil: Abram Harris, Jr., E. Franklin Frazier, and Ralph Bunche, 1919-1941. University of North Carolina Press. ISBN 0807853437.
- Holloway, Jonathan Scott (2013). Jim Crow Wisdom: Memory and Identity in Black America since 1940. University of North Carolina Press. ISBN 9781469610702.
- Holloway, Jonathan Scott (2021). The Cause of Freedom: A Concise History of African Americans. Oxford University Press. ISBN 9780190915193.
- Holloway, Jonathan Scott (2023). African American History: A Very Short Introduction. Oxford University Press. ISBN 9780190915155.

=== Edited volumes ===
- Holloway, Jonathan Scott; Keppel, Ben, eds. (2007). Black Scholars on the Line: Race, Social Science, and American Thought in the Twentieth Century. University of Notre Dame Press. ISBN 9780268030797.

=== Critical editions ===
- Bunche, Ralph J. (2005). Holloway, Jonathan Scott (ed.). A Brief and Tentative Analysis of Negro Leadership. New York University Press. ISBN 9780814736647.
- DuBois, W. E. B. (2015). Holloway, Jonathan Scott (ed.). The Souls of Black Folk. Yale University Press. ISBN 9780300195828.
