= Voorhees Chapel (Rutgers) =

Chapel in New Brunswick, New Jersey, US

Coordinates: 40.48622°N 74.43621°W

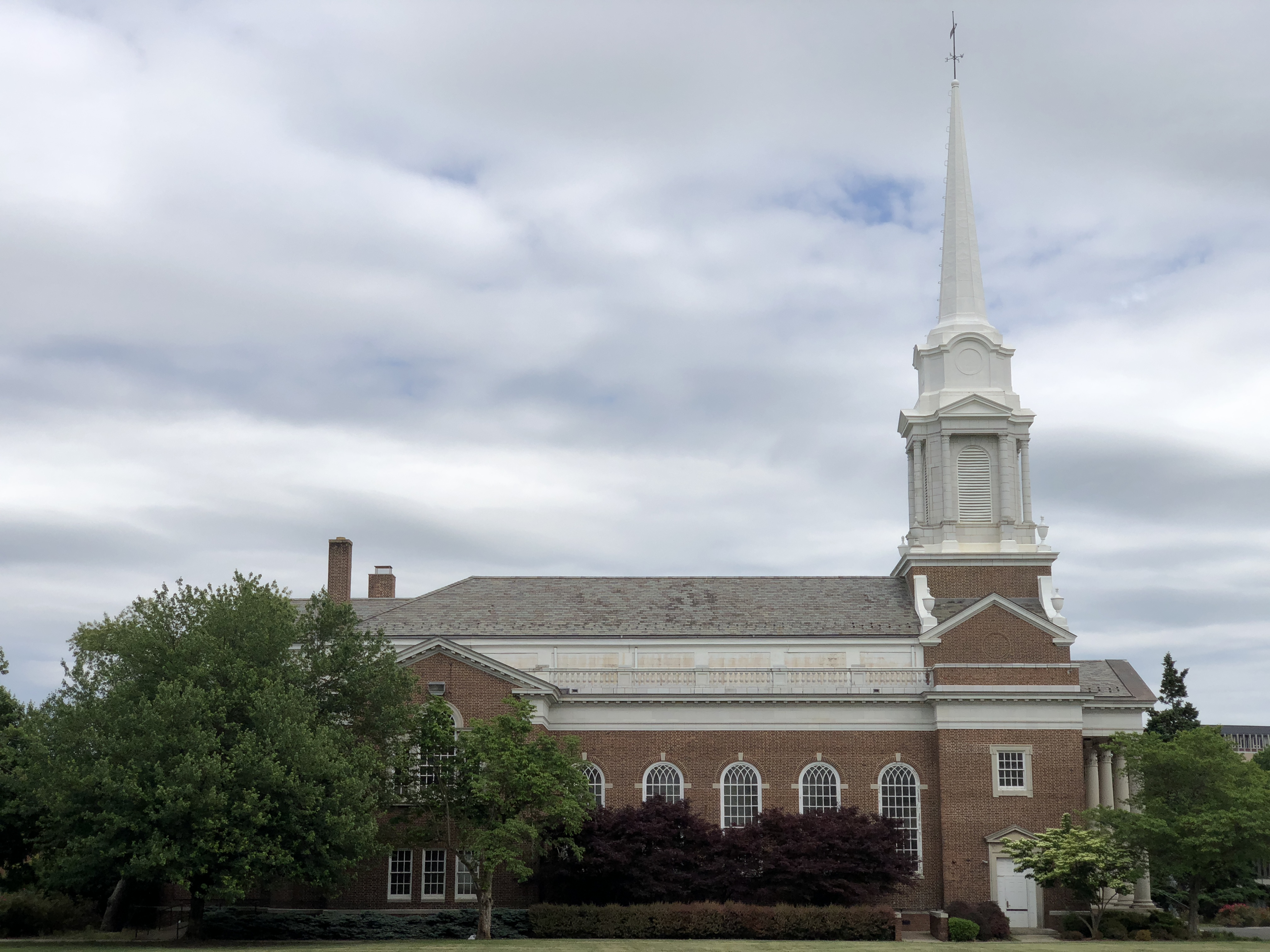
Voorhees Chapel

Voorhees Chapel is one of two chapels on the campus of Rutgers, The State University of New Jersey in New Brunswick, New Jersey. Built in 1925 with a donation from Elizabeth Rodman Voorhees, wife of Rutgers trustee Ralph Voorhees, the chapel once served the community of Douglass College. Douglass, founded the New Jersey College for Women (founded in 1918), was the women's residential college at Rutgers.

The chapel is an example of Georgian period Colonial Revival architecture in the tradition of English architect Sir Christopher Wren.

The chapel houses a large mechanical-action pipe organ built by the Karl Schuke Berliner Orgelbauwerkstatt. The instrument has 3-manuals & pedals, 41 independent registers, 41 speaking stops, and 65 ranks.

== See also ==
- Kirkpatrick Chapel
- Voorhees Mall
