= William Henry Campbell (college president) =

American Presbyterian minister and college president

The Reverend William Henry Campbell
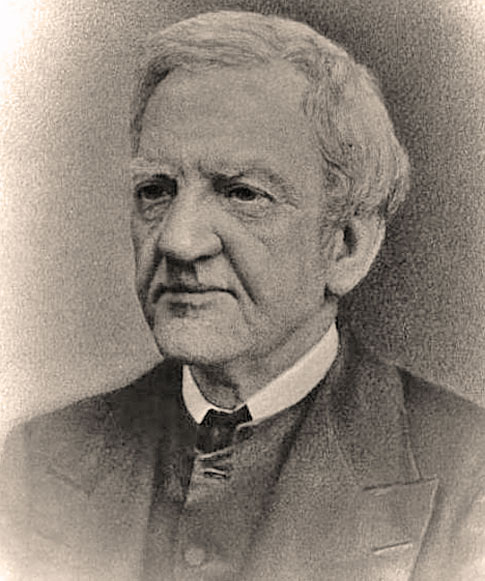

8th President of Rutgers University
- In office 1862–1882
- Preceded by: Theodore Frelinghuysen
- Succeeded by: Merrill Edward Gates

Personal details
- Born: September 14, 1808 Baltimore, Maryland
- Died: December 7, 1890 (aged 82) New Brunswick, New Jersey

William Henry Campbell (September 14, 1808 – December 7, 1890) was an American Presbyterian minister and the eighth President of Rutgers College (now Rutgers University) serving from 1862 to 1882.

== Biography ==
He was born on September 14, 1808.

Receiving his baccalaureate degree from Dickinson College in 1828, Campbell attended Princeton Theological Seminary for one year. For the next few years, Campbell briefly taught and preached at several locations before assuming a position as Professor of Oriental Languages at the New Brunswick Theological Seminary and simultaneously filling the post of Professor of Belles Lettres at Rutgers College. In 1848, Reverend Campbell became Principal of The Albany Academy before he was appointed the president of Rutgers College in 1862.

During his tenure, the separation from the Dutch Reformed Church was about complete, and with the development of the Rutgers Scientific School (established with the assistance of Professor George H. Cook for whom it was later renamed), Rutgers beat out the College of New Jersey (now Princeton University) to be designated by the state legislature as New Jersey's land-grant college in 1864 under the Morrill Act of 1862. During this time, Rutgers constructed the Geological Hall, erected between Old Queens and Van Nest Hall, which housed an armory in the basement, laboratories for the physical sciences on the first floor, and a large museum on the second floor. In the same year the college received the residuary estate of Sophia Astley Kirkpatrick, in the amount of $65,000, which was used to construct Kirkpatrick Chapel which bears her name. The structure, which also contained a library, was dedicated in December 1873. Also, The Daily Targum, one of the oldest college papers in the United States, was first published (1869), the Rutgers Glee Club was formed (1872), and the first intercollegiate athletic games were held, most notably, the first game of College football between Rutgers College and the College of New Jersey (now Princeton University).

He resigned from the presidency of Rutgers College in 1882, because of his failing eyesight. He then organized the Suydam Street Reformed Church in New Brunswick, New Jersey, and served as its pastor until shortly before his death.

He died on December 7, 1890, in New Brunswick, New Jersey.
