= William F. Tate IV =

American sociologist

William Tate
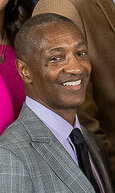
- Tate in 2023

22nd President of Rutgers University
- Incumbent
- Assumed office July 1, 2025
- Preceded by: Jonathan Holloway

28th President of the Louisiana State University System
- In office May 6, 2021 – June 30, 2025
- Preceded by: Tom Galligan (acting)
- Succeeded by: Matt Lee (acting)

Personal details
- Spouse: Kim Cash
- Children: 2
- Education: Northern Illinois University, DeKalb (BS); University of Texas, Dallas (MA); University of Maryland, College Park (PhD); Washington University (MS)
- Scientific career
- Fields: Education sciences
- Workplaces: Washington University; Texas Christian University; University of Wisconsin, Madison; University of South Carolina; Louisiana State University
- Thesis: An Evaluation of the Function Knowledge of a Selected Group of Prospective Secondary Mathematics Teachers (1991)
- Doctoral advisor: Martin Johnson

William F. Tate IV is an American social scientist and higher education administrator currently serving as President of Rutgers University. He previously was the 28th president of Louisiana State University.

== Career ==
William F. Tate IV was born in 1964 or 1965 and grew up in Chicago. He received a Bachelor of Science in economics (with a minor in mathematical sciences) from Northern Illinois University, DeKalb, in 1982, a Master of Arts in teaching mathematics from the University of Texas, Dallas, in 1987, a Doctor of Philosophy in mathematics education (with a minor in mathematical sciences and human development) from the University of Maryland, College Park, in 1991, and a Master of Psychiatric Epidemiology from Washington University School of Medicine in 2011, as well as a postdoctoral fellowship in social policy at the University of Wisconsin, Madison, from 1991 to 1992. During an 18-year tenure at Washington University in St. Louis, Tate served as chair of the Department of Education, director of research centers, dean of the Graduate School, and vice provost for graduate education, while holding the Edward Mallinckrodt Distinguished Professorship in Arts & Sciences. While on the faculty at Washington College in St. Louis, Tate was elected president of the American Educational Research Association. In 2020, he became Provost and Executive Vice President of Academic Affairs at the University of South Carolina, where he was also USC Education Foundation Distinguished Professor. The next academic year, he was named president of the LSU system and chancellor of the Baton Rouge campus. He also held the William L. and Betty F. Adams Chair at Texas Christian University and served on the faculty at University of Wisconsin–Madison. On July 1, 2025, he assumed office and became the 22nd president of Rutgers University. He is also a Distinguished Professor and University Professor at Rutgers University.

== Initiatives ==
At the University of South Carolina, where Tate served as executive vice president for academic affairs and provost, he launched Carolina Online. It delivered a degree program and a way to earn professional credentials online. This established the Provost's Postdoctoral Fellowship program, which enhanced research productivity on campus.

At LSU, Tate launched the "Scholarship First" strategic framework, which emphasized education, research, outreach, and leadership across the university’s campuses. He announced a set of research focus areas called the "Pentagon Priorities," targeting agriculture, biomedical sciences, coastal issues, energy, and defense/cybersecurity. Under his leadership, LSU reported record growth in research expenditures, reaching $543 million in combined activity across campuses, and secured a $245 million philanthropic donation, the largest in the university’s history, to support health initiatives. He also convened a committee of faculty and staff to identify best practices in pedagogy and academic support, while instituting budget measures such as a hiring freeze, consolidation of administrative roles, withholding of departmental funds, and an expansion of LSU Online with the goal of enrolling 10,000 students by 2030.

During Tate's presidency, LSU's Fierce for the Future campaign surpassed its $1.5 billion goal three years ahead of schedule. LSU also reported increased state support for research and other institutional research and academic priorities. While Tate led LSU, the university reported record enrollment across the system, exceeding 55,000 students, and a record number of graduates. The Baton Rouge campus also enrolled its largest first-year class, with 7,494 first-time, full-time students in fiscal year 2024, and reported record entering high school GPA and ACT scores.

LSU athletic programs won multiple national championships during Tate's presidency. The Baton Rouge campus won NCAA championships in women's basketball in 2023, baseball in 2023 and 2025, and women's gymnastics in 2024. LSU Eunice won the 2024 NCAA Division II baseball national championship, while LSU Shreveport won the 2025 NAIA baseball national championship.

At Rutgers, where he began serving as president in 2025, Tate pledged to expand the university’s national research profile, strengthen partnerships with industry, and prioritize affordability and student access. He also emphasized Rutgers’ role as New Jersey’s flagship public institution, noting the importance of sustaining research excellence while navigating challenges related to state funding and enrollment trends. In July 2026, the Rutgers Board of Governors approved a $6.2 billion operating budget for fiscal year 2027, the university's first balanced budget in several years. The budget included cost-containment measures implemented under Tate, such as a university-wide hiring freeze, and limited the tuition increase to 3 percent, the lowest in four years.

== Honors and awards ==
Tate has received, among other honors:

American Academy of Arts and Sciences, Elected Academy Member

American Educational Research Association, Elected Fellow; Senior Scholar Award--SIG Mathematics Education; Lifetime Achievement Award--Division G

National Academy of Education, Elected Academy Member

== Personal life ==
Raised Catholic, Tate is married to Kim Cash Tate, a Protestant author, YouTuber, singer, and speaker. In 2015, Tate described his faith during a Veritas Forum event.

== Controversies ==
After assuming the presidency at Rutgers, Tate refused to live in the on-campus President's Mansion where university presidents have typically assumed residence. His adult daughter resides there, free of charge, while Tate and his wife live at another university-funded home.

In April of 2026, Tate came under fire for retaining Donald Trump's former attorney, Kendra Wharton. Wharton had previously defended Trump after he was indicted on federal charges related to possession of classified documents in an effort to overturn the 2020 election. Wharton was retained by the university in August of 2025 after abruptly closing their DEI office.

In October of 2026, NJ.com broke the news that Rutgers had quietly purchased a $1.5 million dollar AI-powered software system. The Avigilon product (a subsidiary of Motorola) can track people and cars, read license plates, detect crowd formation, a person crawling, and a visible firearm. Cameras were installed throughout the New Brunswick campus with no notification to faculty, staff, or students. Many campus community members found out the news when the story was posted on Reddit. The system connects with pre-existing surveillance cameras, expanding the reach of the system significantly. This story broke a week after Tate publicly stressed the need for budget cuts and referenced "hard (financial) decisions in the future."
