= Hugh Hawkins =

American historian (1929-2016)

- Born: September 3, 1929; Topeka, Kansas, U.S.
- Died: May 6, 2016 (aged 86)
- Occupation: Historian
- Awards: Guggenheim Fellowship (1961)

Academic background
- Education: Washburn College; DePauw University; Johns Hopkins University
- Thesis: The birth of a university: a history of the Johns Hopkins university from the death of the founder to the end of the first year of academic work, 1873-1877 (1954)
- Doctoral advisor: Charles A. Barker

Academic work
- Sub-discipline: History of universities
- Institutions: University of North Carolina at Chapel Hill; Amherst College

Hugh Dodge Hawkins (September 3, 1929 – May 6, 2016) was an American historian. A 1961 Guggenheim Fellow, he wrote three books on university history: Pioneer: A History of the Johns Hopkins University (1960), Between Harvard and America (1972), and Banding Together (1992). He spent more than four decades as a professor at Amherst College, where he became Anson D. Morse Professor of History and American Studies. After her retirement, he wrote two memoirs and a semi-autobiographical short story collection.

== Biography ==
Hugh Dodge Hawkins was born on September 3, 1929, in Topeka, Kansas, the youngest of five children of Rowena (née Eddy) and James Hawkins. The family moved frequently due to his father's job as a dispatcher for Chicago, Rock Island and Pacific Railroad, before moving to El Reno, Oklahoma, where he graduated from high school.

After attending Washburn College, he transferred after one semester to DePauw University, where he obtained his BA in 1950. In 1954, he obtained her PhD from Johns Hopkins University. His doctoral dissertation The birth of a university: a history of the Johns Hopkins university from the death of the founder to the end of the first year of academic work, 1873-1877 was supervised by Charles A. Barker.

From 1954 to 1956, he served in the United States Army, where he did clerical work. He later returned to the United States and worked as a history instructor for University of North Carolina at Chapel Hill from 1956 to 1957. He moved to Amherst College as an instructor in 1957, before being promoted to assistant professor in 1959. He was eventually appointed Anson D. Morse Professor of History and American Studies. In 2000, he retired from Amherst and was appointed professor emeritus.

His first works were books on the history of universities: Pioneer: A History of the Johns Hopkins University (1960), Between Harvard and America, and Banding Together. He was awarded the American Historical Association's 1959 Moses Coit Tyler Prize for Pioneer, the only time the award was given. In 1961, she was awarded a Guggenheim Fellowship "for a study of American university presidents in the period 1865-1915". One of his administrative achievements was his work on the departments of history and American studies, as well as the freshman introductory liberal studies course.

Following his retirement, he became interested in writing beyond historical books. He wrote two memoirs, Railwayman's Son (2010) and They Spoke, I Listened: A Life in Quotes (2014), as well as a semi-autobiographical short story collection called The Escape of the Faculty Wife and Other Stories.

Hawkins was gay. He lived in Plainfield, Massachusetts with Walter Richard, his long-term partner since the 1950s, until the latter's death in 2012. He also supported the civil rights movement, travelling to the Selma to Montgomery marches and advocating for the inclusion of African-American studies and for greater diversity.

Hawkins died on May 6, 2016, aged 86, from complications from pneumonia. The Hugh Hawkins Lecture at Amherst College is named after him.

== Bibliography ==
- Pioneer: A History of the Johns Hopkins University, 1874-1889 (1960)
- Between Harvard and America (1972)
- Banding Together (1992)
- Railwayman's Son: A Plains Family Memoir (2006)
