= Philip Milledoler Brett =

American academic administrator (1871–1960)

13th President of Rutgers University
- In office 1930–1931
- Preceded by: John Martin Thomas
- Succeeded by: Robert Clarkson Clothier

Personal details
- Born: February 17, 1871; Newark, New Jersey
- Died: July 2, 1960 (aged 89); Manhattan, New York City
- Spouse: Abigail Strong
- Children: 2
- Relatives: Francis Rombouts, ancestor Philip Milledoler, second-great-grandfather

Philip Milledoler Brett, Sr. (February 17, 1871 – July 2, 1960) was the thirteenth President of Rutgers University, serving in an acting capacity from 1930 to 1931.

== Biography ==
He was born in Newark, New Jersey, and was the great-great-grandson of Philip Milledoler. While attending Rutgers, he was the captain of the football team that played Princeton University in 1892 in which he was apocryphally credited with saying: "I'd die to win this game." He graduated with a baccalaureate degree from Rutgers College in 1892, and then received a Bachelor of Laws (LL.B.) from the New York Law School and a degree from the New Brunswick Theological Seminary.

He married and had two children: Philip Milledoler Brett, Jr. and Margaret Brett Tenney.

He received an honorary degree from Rutgers University in 1916. At the time of his selection as acting president, Brett was made a partner in the Manhattan law firm of Nevius, Brett and Kellogg in 1898.

During the Great Depression, the university was in disagreement with the newly established State Board of Regents, and morale was low among the faculty. After eighteen months, morale was restored and despite the requests of faculty for him to accept a full appointment as president, Brett declined. He continued his service as a Trustee of the university for over fifty years.

He retired from law in 1948, and died on July 2, 1960, at his home in Manhattan.
