= Philip Brett (cricketer) =

English cricketer (1816–1872)

Personal information
- Born: c. 1816; Mount Bures, Essex
- Died: 9 January 1872 (aged 55–56); Mount Bures, Essex
- Source: Cricinfo, 10 April 2017

Philip Brett (c. 1816 – 9 January 1872) was an English cricketer. He played two first-class matches for Cambridge University Cricket Club between 1846 and 1847.

== See also ==
- List of Cambridge University Cricket Club players
