= Merrill Edwards Gates =

American academic administrator (1848–1922)

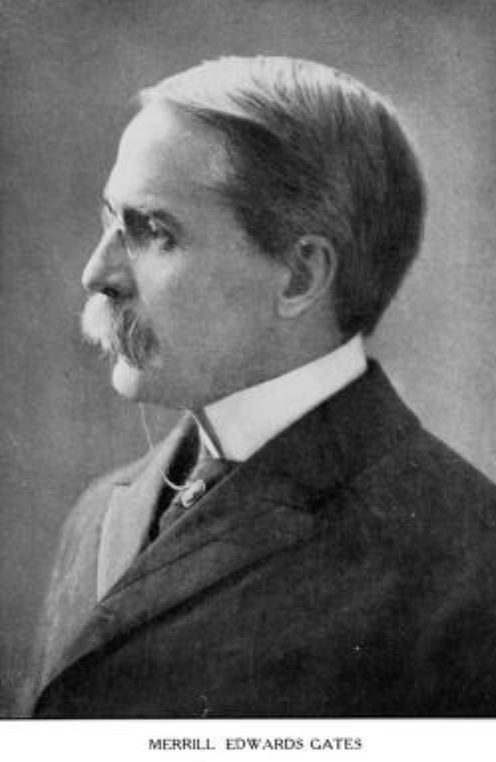

9th President of Rutgers University
- In office 1882–1890
- Preceded by: William Henry Campbell
- Succeeded by: Austin Scott

6th President of Amherst College
- In office 1890–1899
- Preceded by: Julius Hawley Seelye
- Succeeded by: George Harris

Personal details
- Born: Merrill Edwards Gates; April 6, 1848 Warsaw, New York
- Died: August 11, 1922 (aged 74) Littleton, New Hampshire
- Parent: Seth Merrill Gates
- Education: The Albany Academy; University of Rochester

Merrill Edwards Gates (April 6, 1848 – August 11, 1922) was the ninth President of Rutgers College (now Rutgers University) serving from 1882 to 1890, and the sixth President of Amherst College, serving from 1890 to 1899.

== Biography ==
He was born at Warsaw, New York on April 6, 1848, to Seth Merrill Gates.

Gates received his baccalaureate degree at the University of Rochester, where he achieved high honors in Mathematics, Latin and Greek, and received the English Essay Prize in his senior year.

He served as principal for twelve years at The Albany Academy in Albany, New York, and visited the Rugby School and the University of Oxford in England from 1872 to 1875. Upon his return to the United States, he was offered the post of Chancellor of the University of Tennessee but declined and remained in Albany. He went abroad again in 1879, spending a year in travel and study in France, Italy, Egypt, Palestine, and Greece. Upon this second return, the University of the State of New York conferred on him a degree in honoris causa in 1880, and in 1882, both the College of New Jersey (now Princeton University and the University of Rochester awarded him the degree of Doctor of Laws. He received the LL.D. degree from Columbia University in 1891 and from Williams College in 1893. Columbia University also conferred upon him the degree of Doctor of Humane Letters (L.H.D.) in 1887. He was elected as a member to the American Philosophical Society in 1886.

During his tenure as President of Rutgers College, which began in 1882, Gates built the college's first dormitory, Winants Hall (completed in 1890) named for Garrett E. Winants, and New Jersey Hall (funded by the state), which was used for instruction in chemistry and biology (now home of the economics department). Under the provisions of the Hatch Act, in 1887, Rutgers established the Agricultural Experiment Station, and under the Morrill Act of 1890, increase funding for the scientific school.

In 1890, Gates resigned as President of Rutgers University to become President of Amherst College (from 1890 to 1899) in Massachusetts.

After his tenure at Amherst, Gates was appointed to be chairman of the Board of Indian Commissioners, and later named secretary of the board where he served from 1899 to 1912. He remained in Washington, DC presenting lectures and serving literary and philanthropic societies, and preaching in the Congregational Church.

He died at his summer home in Littleton, New Hampshire on August 11, 1922, he was 74 years old.

== Selected works ==
- Land and Law as Agents in Educating the Indians (1885)
- Sidney Lanier, Poet and Artist (1887)
- International Arbitration (1897)
- The Highest Use of Wealth (1901)
- Men of Mark in America (1905-6)

Academic offices
Preceded by William Henry Campbell	President of Rutgers University; 1882–1890	Succeeded by Austin Scott
Preceded by Julius Hawley Seelye	President of Amherst College; 1890–1899	Succeeded by George Harris
