= List of New Brunswick Theological Seminary people =

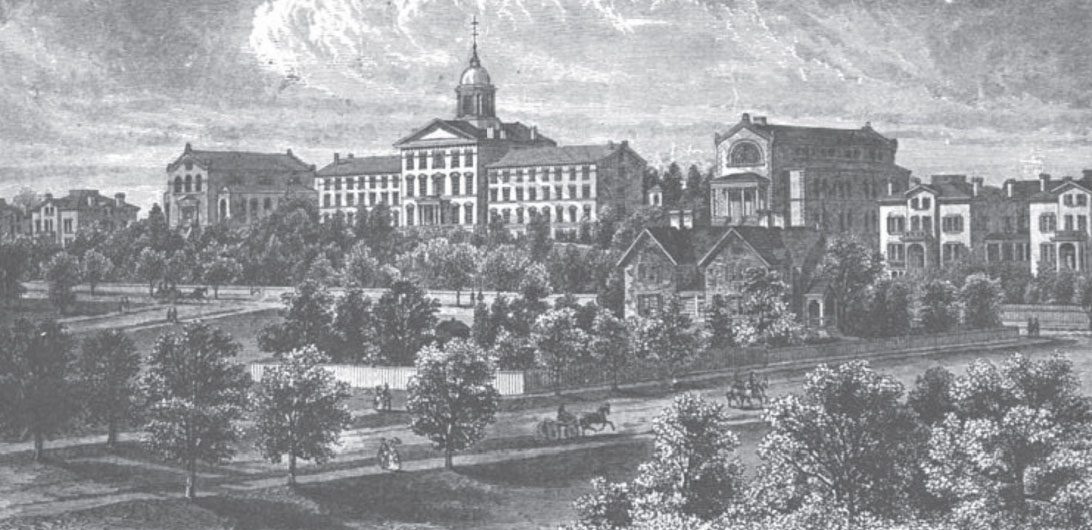
An 1880 print of the seminary campus, depicting the Sage Library (left center), Hertzog Hall (center), and Suydam Hall (right center)

New Brunswick Theological Seminary is a Christian seminary affiliated with the Reformed Church in America (RCA), a mainline Reformed Protestant denomination in Canada and the United States that follows the theological tradition and Christian practice of John Calvin. (Note: Note, before 1819, RCA was the North American branch of the Dutch Reformed Church.) The seminary offers that offers professional and graduate degree programs for candidates for ministry and those pursuing careers in academia. The seminary also offers certificates and training programs to lay church leaders seeking advanced courses. For over 240 years, the seminary's faculty and alumni have taken key roles in the ministry of the Reformed Church and other Christian denominations, in academia, and in the professional world.

Founded in 1784, New Brunswick Theological Seminary is the oldest seminary in the United States and one of seminaries operated by the Reformed Church in America. It currently has two campuses: Its main campus was built in 1856, in New Brunswick, New Jersey adjacent to the campus of Rutgers University. While rooted in the Reformed faith, the seminary is dedicated to providing a comprehensive Christian education as "an inter-cultural, ecumenical school of Christian faith, learning, and scholarship committed to its metro-urban and global contexts."

== Leaders of the seminary ==
The board of trustees appoints a president to serve as the seminary's chief administrative and executive officer. The current seminary president is Rev. Micah L. McCreary, M.Div., Ph.D., who has served in that capacity since 2017. The current vice president and dean of academic affairs is Rev. Charles Rix, Ph.D.

The seminary's first leader was the Rev. John Henry Livingston, who was appointed in 1784 to start instructing candidates for ministry. He began to do so in his New York City home, and a few years moved the seminary to Flatbush. In 1810, Livingston accepted the presidency of Queen's College in New Brunswick, New Jersey (now Rutgers, The State University of New Jersey), and moved the seminary to that city.

The title of "president of the seminary" was first used with regard to the administrator of the school in 1923. The role was known as "dean of the seminary" from 1883 to 1888, and was filled by the oldest professor in years of service who would be entrusted with the management of the seminary. That title became "president of the faculty" from 1888 to 1923. Today, the president of the seminary is simultaneously appointed to the John Henry Livingston Professor of Theology, created upon the recommendation of outgoing president M. Stephen James. In 1959, James was appointed to the chair in an emeritus capacity, and the chair was first occupied by the seminary's eight president, Justin Vander Kolk.

#	Portrait	Person	Took office	Left office	Career	Notes
-		John Henry Livingston (1746–1825)	1784	1825	Education: Yale College (A.B., 1762); University of Utrecht (Th.D., 1770); Ordained as Dutch Reformed minister by Classis of Amsterdam, appointed professor of theology by Synod of New York	
1		Samuel Merrill Woodbridge (1819–1905)	1883	1901	Education: New York University (A.B., 1838); New Brunswick Theological Seminary, (A.M., 1841); Reformed minister, taught at Rutgers as professor of metaphysics and mental philosophy (1857–1864), and at seminary as professor of church government, ecclesiastical history, and pastoral theology (1857–1901); appointed dean of the seminary (1883–1887) and president of the faculty (1887–1901)	
2	-	John Preston Searle (1854–1922)	1902	1922	Education: Rutgers College (A.B., 1875); New Brunswick Theological Seminary (1878); professor of systematic theology (1893–1922); appointed president of the faculty in 1902 until his death	
3	-	John Howard Raven	1922	1924	Rutgers College (A.B., 1891); New Brunswick Theological Seminary (1894); professor of Old Testament languages and exegesis; appointed president of the faculty 1922, president of the seminary 1923	
4	-	William Henry Steele Demarest (1863–1956)	1925	1935	Rutgers College, (A.B., 1883); New Brunswick Theological Seminary (1888); Appointed as seminary president in 1925; previously professor of church government and ecclesiastical history, president of Rutgers College (1906–1924); President of the General Synod, RCA, 1909	
5	-	John Walter Beardslee Jr. (1879–1962)	1935	1947	Education: Hope College (1898), Western Theological Seminary (1903); taught at Hope College and Western Theological Seminary before coming to New Brunswick as professor of New Testament	
6	-	Joseph R. Sizoo (1885–1966)	1947	1952	Education: New Brunswick Theological Seminary (1910); Pastor at the New York Avenue Presbyterian Church in Washington DC and St Nicholas Collegiate Church in New York City	-
7	-	M. Stephen James	1953	1959	Professor of practical theology; president of the RCA General Synod (1944–1945)	-
8	-	Justin W. Vander Kolk	1959	1963	-	-
9	-	Wallace Newlin Jamison (1918–2010)	1963	1969	Education: Westminster College (B.A., 1941); Princeton Theological Seminary (Th.B. 1943); University of Edinburgh (Ph.D., 1948); World War II Navy chaplain and Presbyterian minister; professor of history at Westminster College and later Illinois College; professor of church history and dean of the seminary	
10	-	Herman J. Ridder (1925–2002)	1969	1971	Education: Hope College (1949); Western Theological Seminary (1952); Chicago Theological Seminary (M.Th. 1967); Reformed minister serving congregations in Illinois, Iowa, Michigan and California.; Served as president of Western Theological Seminary (1963–1971) and attempted to unify curriculums and administration at NBTS and WTS.	
—	-	Lester J. Kuyper (1904–1986) (interim)	1971	1973	Education: Hope College (B.A., 1928); Western Theological Seminary (B.D., 1932); Princeton Theological Seminary (M.Th. 1937); Union Theological Seminary (D.Th., 1939); professor of Old Testament at Western Theological (1939–1974); president of RCA General Synod (1970); interim president of both New Brunswick and Western	
11	-	Howard G. Hageman (1921–1992)	1973	1985	Education: Harvard University (A.B., 1942); New Brunswick Theological Seminary (B.D., 1945); attended Princeton Theological Seminary, Central College (D.D., 1957)	
12	-	Robert A. White	1985	1992	-	-
13	-	Norman J. Kansfield (1940–2024)	1993	2005	Education: A.B. Hope College (A.B., 1962); Western Theological Seminary (B.D., 1965), Union Theological Seminary (S.T.M., 1967); University of Chicago (M.A., 1970, Ph.D., 1981)	
—	-	Edwin G. Mulder (born 1929) (interim)	2005	2006	Education: Central College (1951); Western Theological Seminary (1954); served as minister to congregations in New Jersey, New York, and Michigan; president of RCA General Synod (1979–1980); third general secretary of the Reformed Church (1983–1994); prominent in the civil rights advocacy to end Apartheid in South Africa	
14	-	Gregg A. Mast	2006	2017	Education: Hope College (B.A., 1974); New Brunswick Theological Seminary (M.Div., 1976); Drew University (M.Phil., 1981, Ph.D., 1985); President of the General Synod of the Reformed Church in America (1999–2000); As minister, served congregations in Johannesburg, South Africa, New Jersey and New York	
15		Micah L. McCreary	2017	Incumbent	Education: B.S. University of Michigan; M.Div. Virginia Union University; M.S. Virginia Commonwealth University; Ph.D. Virginia Commonwealth University	

== Faculty ==
Faculty members listed below in bold text were also alumni of the New Brunswick Theological Seminary.

- William Henry Campbell, (1808–1890), professor of Oriental Languages, later eighth president of Rutgers College (1862–1882)
- **David D. Demarest** (1819–1898), professor of Pastoral Theology and Sacred Rhetoric
- **William Henry Steele Demarest** (1863–1956), professor of Ecclesiastical History and Church Government, eleventh president of Rutgers University (1906–1924), president of NBTS (1925–1934)
- Philip Milledoler (1775–1852), professor of didactic theology, fifth president of Rutgers College (1825–1840)

== Alumni ==
- B.D. = Bachelor of Divinity
- M.Div. = Master of Divinity
- M.A. or A.M. = Master of Arts
- D.Min = Doctor of Ministry

Name	Degree	Year	Career	Notes
Gustavus Abeel (1801–1887)			an American pastor, missionary and writer	—
Philip Milledoler Brett (1871–1960)			lawyer, thirteenth president of Rutgers University (1930–31)	—
Edward Tanjore Corwin (1834–1914)	B.D.	1856	writer, church historian	—
David D. Demarest	M.A.	1840	Reformed clergyman, author, professor of pastoral theology and sacred rhetoric	—
William Henry Steele Demarest			professor of church history, eleventh president of Rutgers College (1906–1924), president of New Brunswick Theological Seminary (1925–1935)	—
William Montague Ferry		1822	Presbyterian minister, missionary, and community leader who founded several settlements in Ottawa County, Michigan	
William Elliot Griffis (1843–1928)			orientalist, Congregational minister, author	—
Henry Demarest Lloyd (1847–1903)	-	-	19th-century American progressive political activist and pioneer muckraking journalist, remembered for exposés of the Standard Oil Company	—
Gregg A. Mast	M.Div.	1976	Reformed clergyman, educator, President of New Brunswick Theological Seminary (2006–present)	—
Abraham Johannes "A.J." Muste (1885–1967)			Dutch-born American clergyman and political activist	—
Jared Waterbury Scudder		1855	medical doctor, missionary in India, prepared Tamil translation of the Bible and other Christian writings	—
Robert W. Searle	B.D.	1921	Reformed and Presbyterian clergyman, general secretary of the Greater New York Federation of Churches, son of John Preston Searle	
John Van Nest Talmage			missionary to China	—
Thomas De Witt Talmage (1832–1902)			preacher, prominent 19th-century religious leader and orator	—
Samuel Merrill Woodbridge (1819–1905)	M.A.	1841	Reformed clergyman, author, educator; professor of metaphysics and mental philosophy at Rutgers College (1857–1864); professor of ecclesiastical history and church government (1857–1901); led seminary as its first dean, and as first president of the faculty (1883–1901)	—
Samuel Marinus Zwemer (1867–1952)	M.A.	1890	American Christian missionary ("The Apostle to Islam") and scholar	—

== See also ==
- List of Rutgers University people
- List of colleges and universities in New Jersey
