= Elmwood Cemetery (New Jersey) =

Cemetery in North Brunswick, New Jersey, US

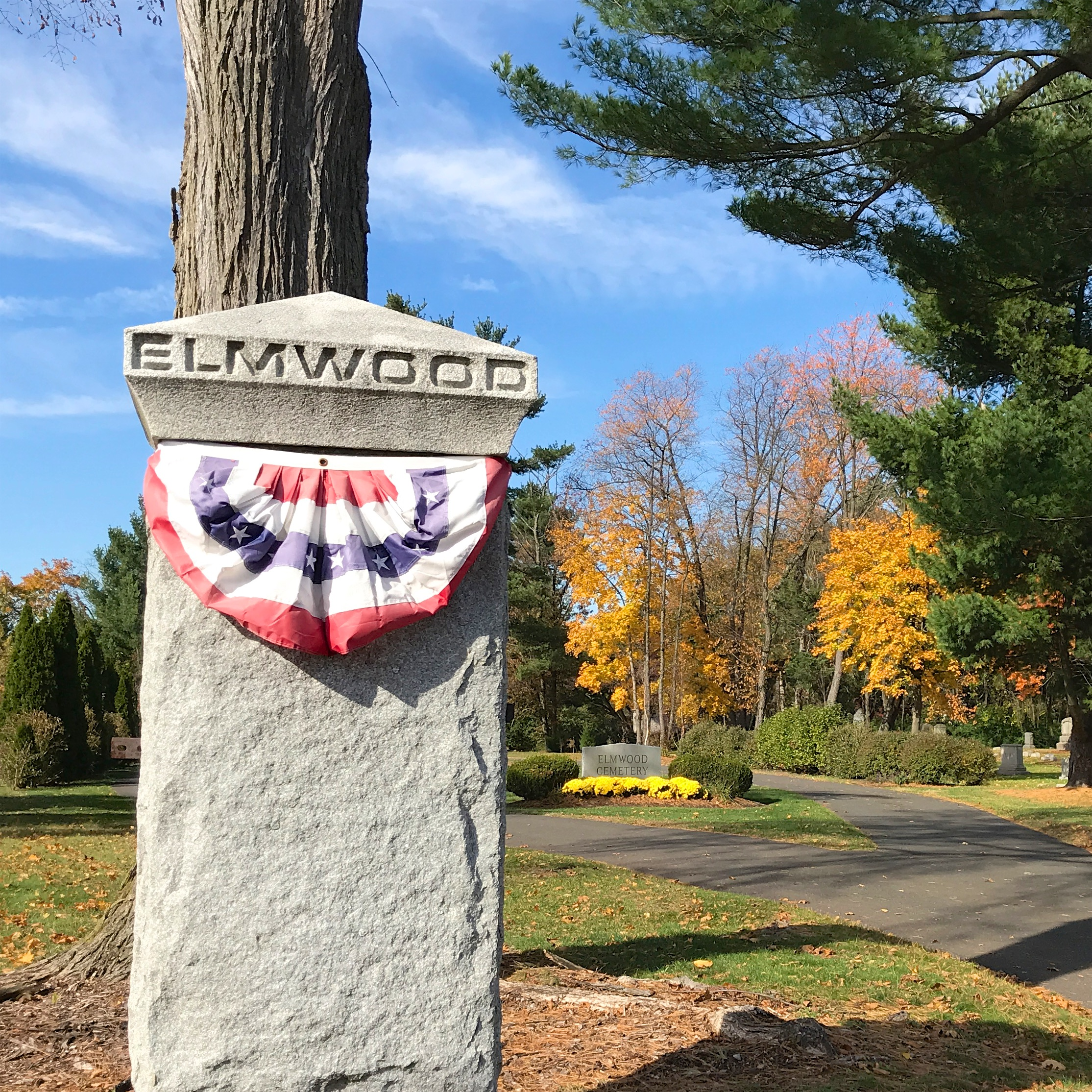
- Georges Road entrance
- Interactive map of Elmwood Cemetery

Details
- Established: 1868
- Location: 425 Georges Road; North Brunswick, New Jersey
- Coordinates: 40°28′30″N 74°27′04″W
- Type: Public
- Find a Grave: Elmwood Cemetery

The Elmwood Cemetery is located at 425 Georges Road in North Brunswick, Middlesex County, New Jersey. It borders New Brunswick, New Jersey. The cemetery was established in 1868.

== Notable burials ==
- John Baillie McIntosh (1829–1888), Union Army brigadier general in the American Civil War
- Charles H. Bell (1798–1875), Rear Admiral in the United States Navy, served during the War of 1812, the Second Barbary War, and the American Civil War
- James Bishop (1816–1895), Opposition Party politician, represented New Jersey's 3rd congressional district in the United States House of Representatives from 1855–1857
- Henry de la Bruyere Carpender (1882–1934), of the Hall–Mills murder case
- Rev. David D. Demarest, D.D., LL.D. (1819–1898), Reformed clergyman, professor at New Brunswick Theological Seminary (1865–1898)
- William Henry Steele Demarest (1863–1956), eleventh President of Rutgers College (now Rutgers University)
- Robert Wood Johnson II (1893–1968), president of Johnson & Johnson
- Frederick Barnett Kilmer (1851–1934), director of Scientific Laboratories for Johnson & Johnson, developed their baby powder, father of Joyce Kilmer
- Joyce Kilmer (1886–1918), who was buried in France, is honored by a cenotaph erected in his family's plot in the cemetery.
- George C. Ludlow (1830–1900), 25th Governor of New Jersey, from 1881–1884
- John Baillie McIntosh (1829–1888), Union Army brigadier general in the American Civil War
- Miles Ross (1827–1903), Mayor of New Brunswick, represented New Jersey's 3rd congressional district in the United States House of Representatives from 1875–1883
- Rev. Samuel Merrill Woodbridge, D.D., LL.D. (1819–1905), Reformed clergyman, professor at Rutgers College (1857–1864) and New Brunswick Theological Seminary (1857–1901), led the seminary (1883–1901)

== Gallery ==
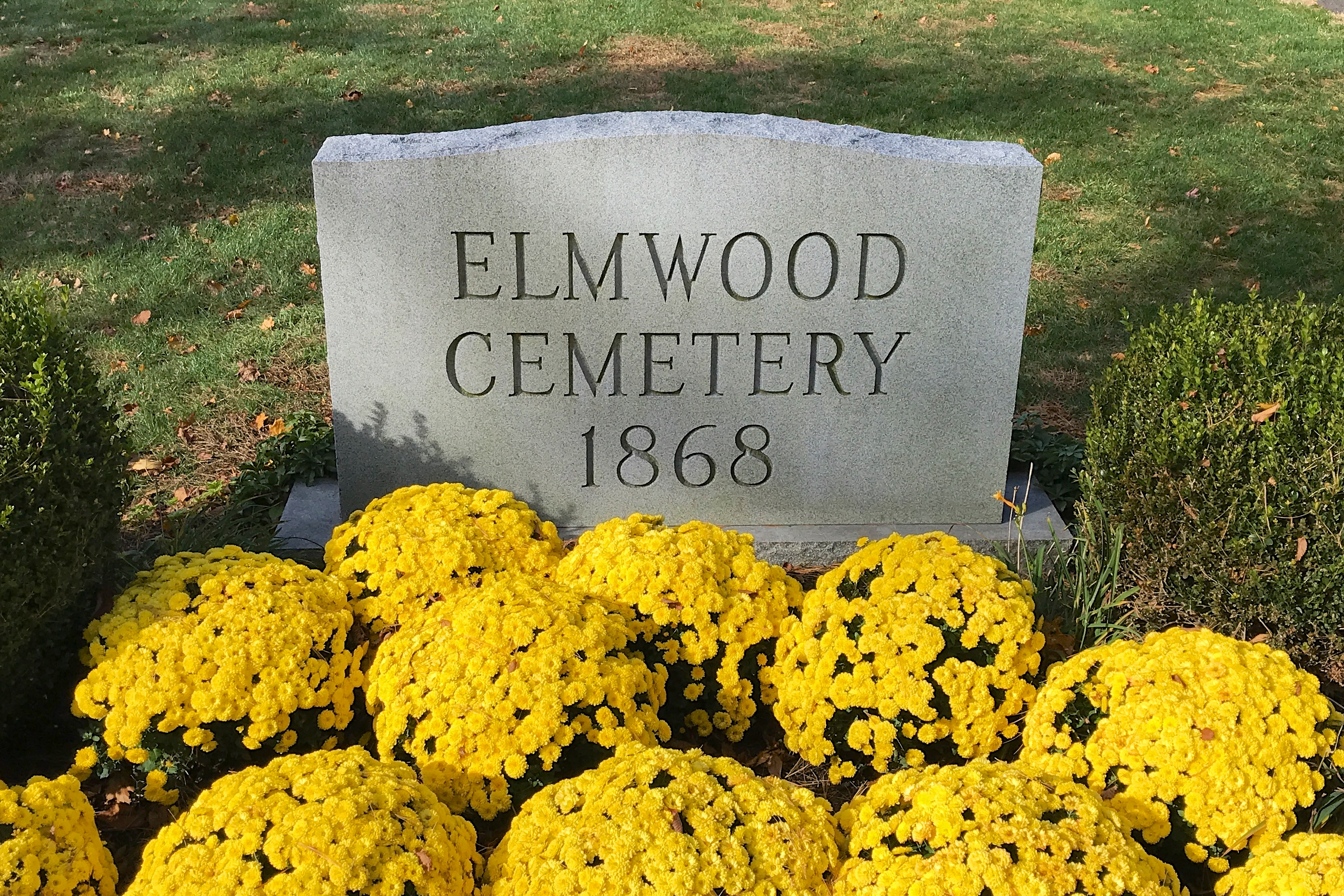
Year established at the Georges Road entrance

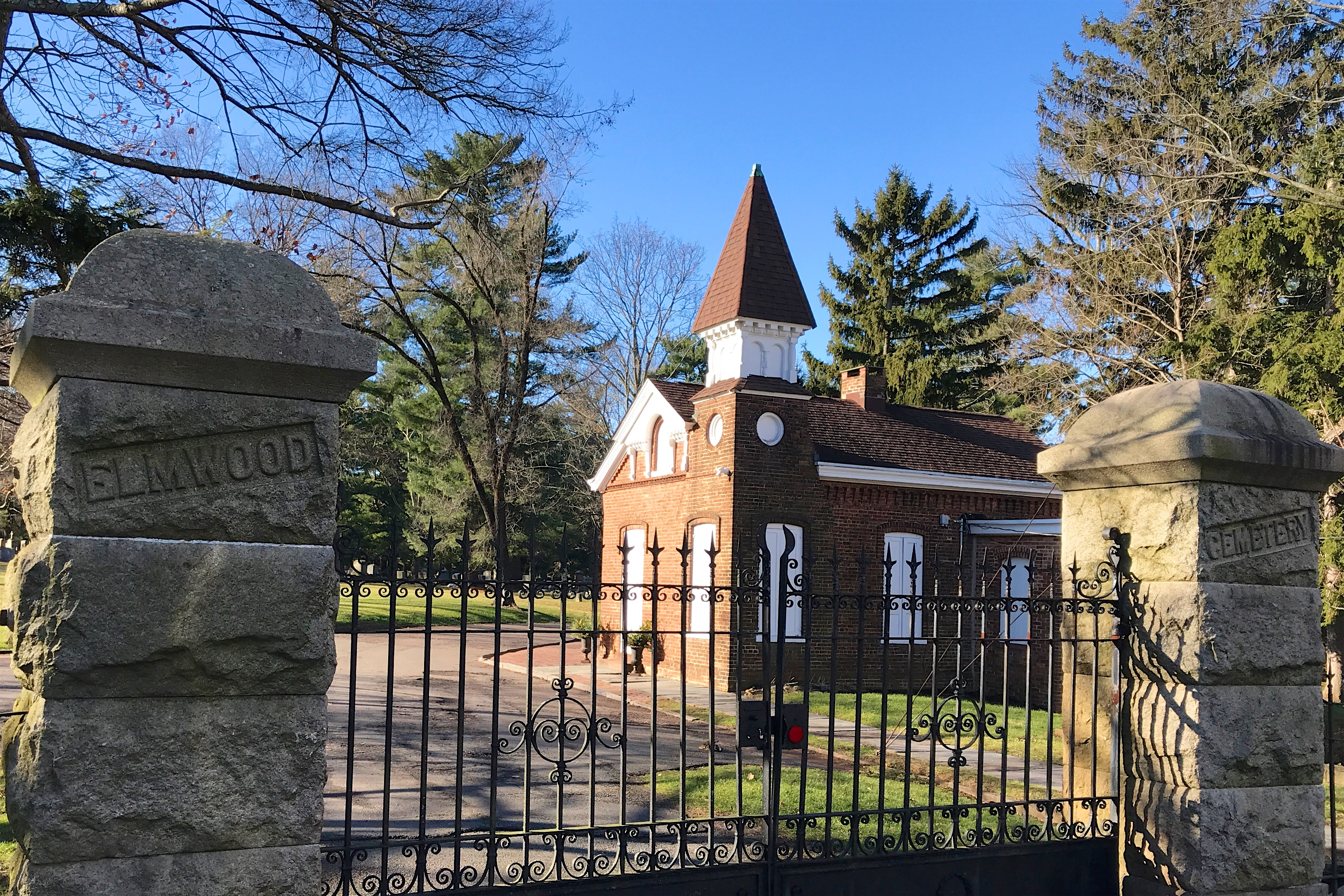
Queen Anne style gatehouse at the Paul Robeson Boulevard entrance

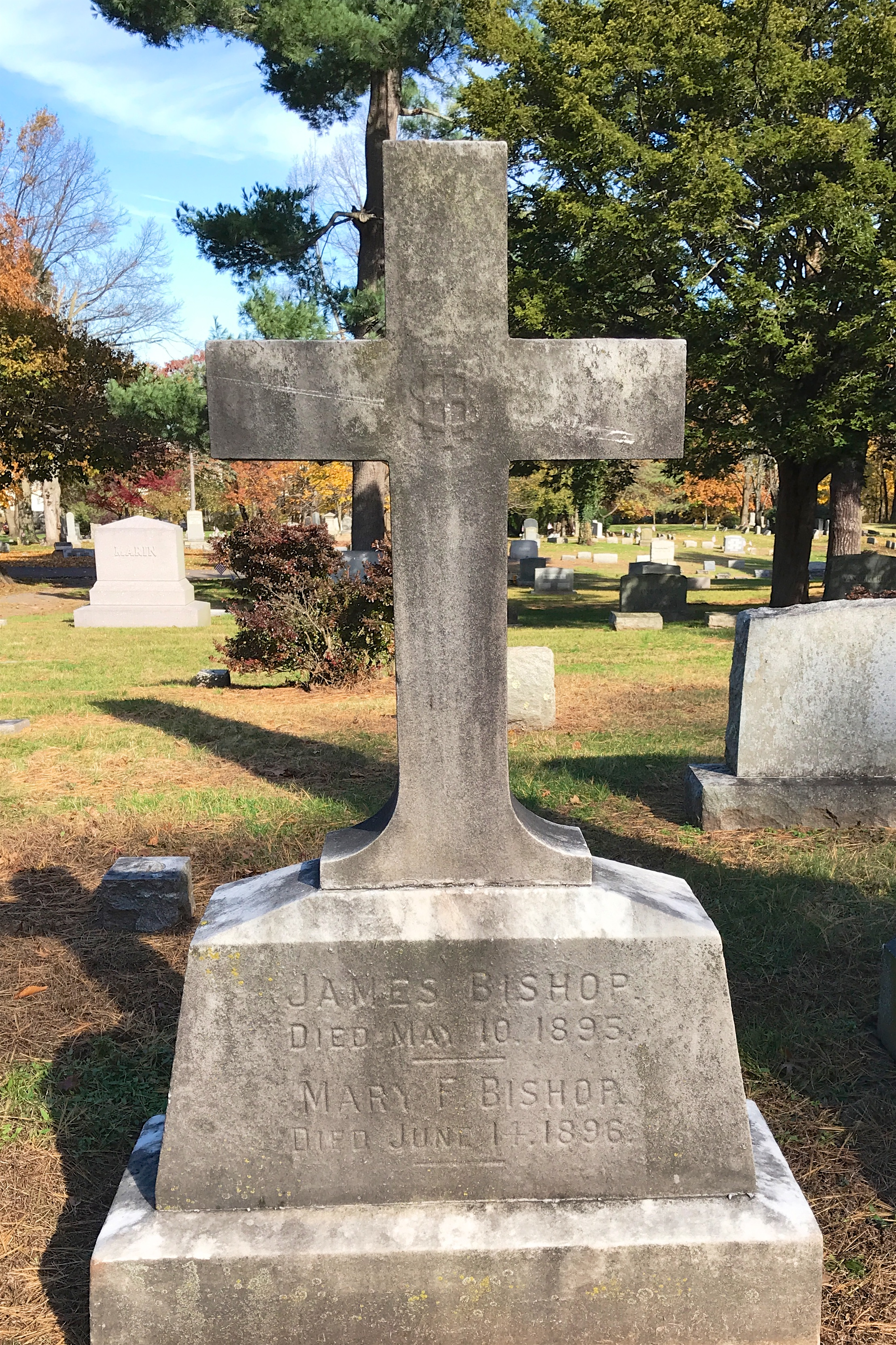
Gravestone of James Bishop (1816–1895) and his wife Mary

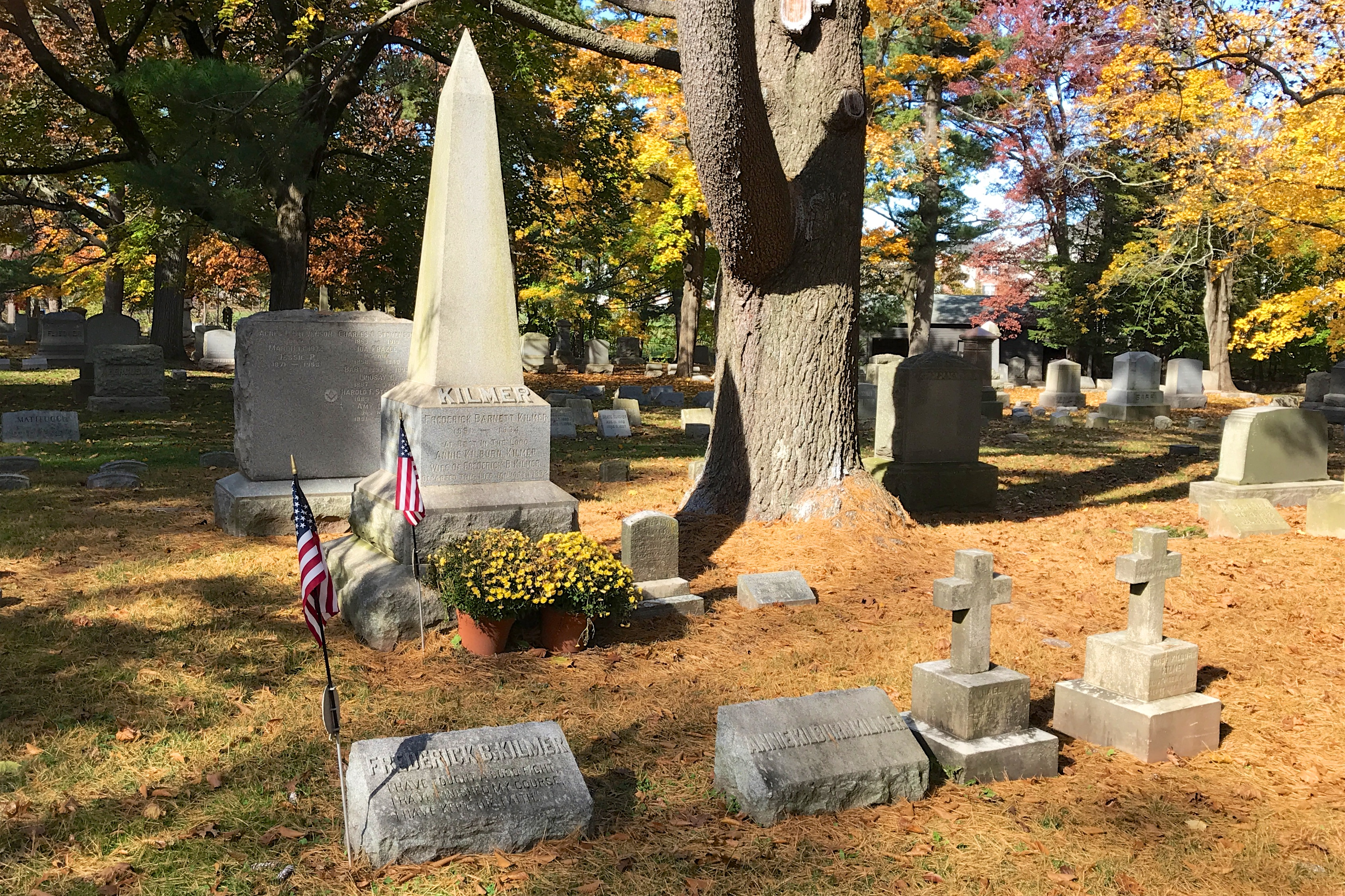
Gravestones of the Frederick Barnett Kilmer family and the cenotaph for his son, Joyce Kilmer

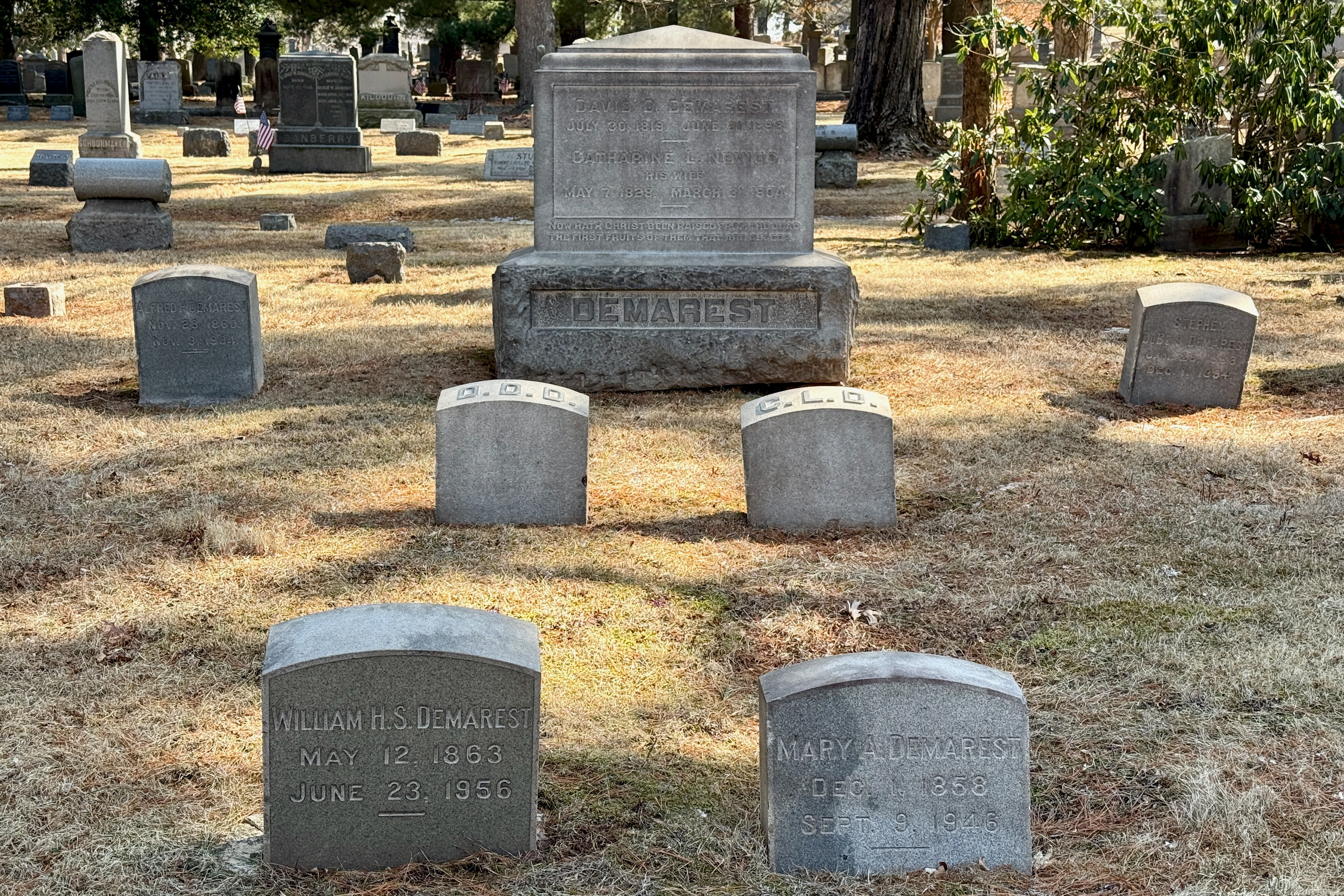
Gravestones of David D. Demarest, his wife, Catharine Louisa Nevius, and children, William Henry Steele Demarest and Mary A. Demarest
