= John Preston Searle =

American minister (1854–1922)

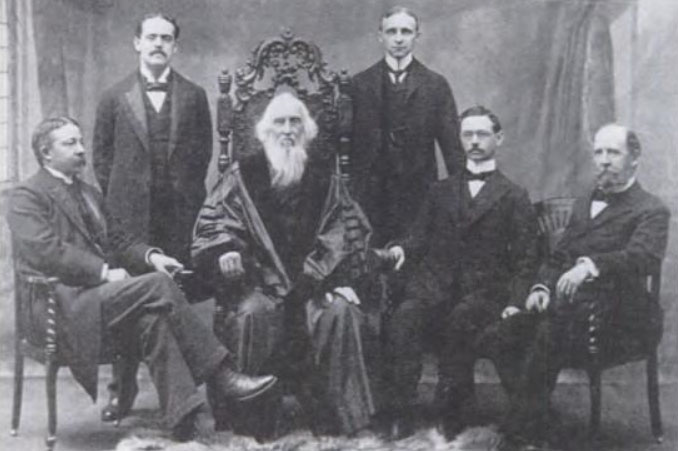
New Brunswick Theological Seminary's faculty c. 1904 (left to right), John Preston Searle, John Howard Raven, Samuel Merrill Woodbridge, William Henry Steele Demarest, John Hamilton Gillespie, and Ferdinand Schureman Schenck

Rev. John Preston Searle, D.D. (September 12, 1854 - July 26, 1922) was a U.S. minister and educator in the Reformed Church in America. Searle was the James Suydam Professor of Systematic Theology at New Brunswick Theological Seminary in New Brunswick, New Jersey (1893-1922), as well as President of the Faculty (1902–22). He was born in Schuylerville, New York and died in Cragsmoor, New York.

== Biography ==
He was the son of the Reverend Samuel T. Searle. Not only his father, but his uncles as well, Stephen Searle and Jeremiah Searle, and his younger brother, Edward V. V. Searle, were ministers of the Reformed Church. Searle married Susan Bovey in 1882. He had at least two sons, Robert W. Searle and Raymond B. Searle.

Searle graduated from Rutgers College (now Rutgers University) in 1875 and from the New Brunswick Seminary in 1878. He became pastor of the church at Griggstown, New Jersey until 1881, when he was called to the First Reformed Church of Somerville, New Jersey, where he served until 1893. In 1893, the Genera! Synod chose Searle to fill a vacant chair in the seminary; and Rutgers College at once conferred upon him the honorary degree of Doctor of Divinity. In 1900, he was chosen president of the faculty. He served as a member of the Board of Foreign Missions and of its executive committee, and an officer of the Arabian Mission, as well as serving as president of the General Synod. He was also President of the Council of the Reformed Churches.
