= Demarest House (New Brunswick, New Jersey) =

- U.S. National Register of Historic Places
- New Jersey Register of Historic Places
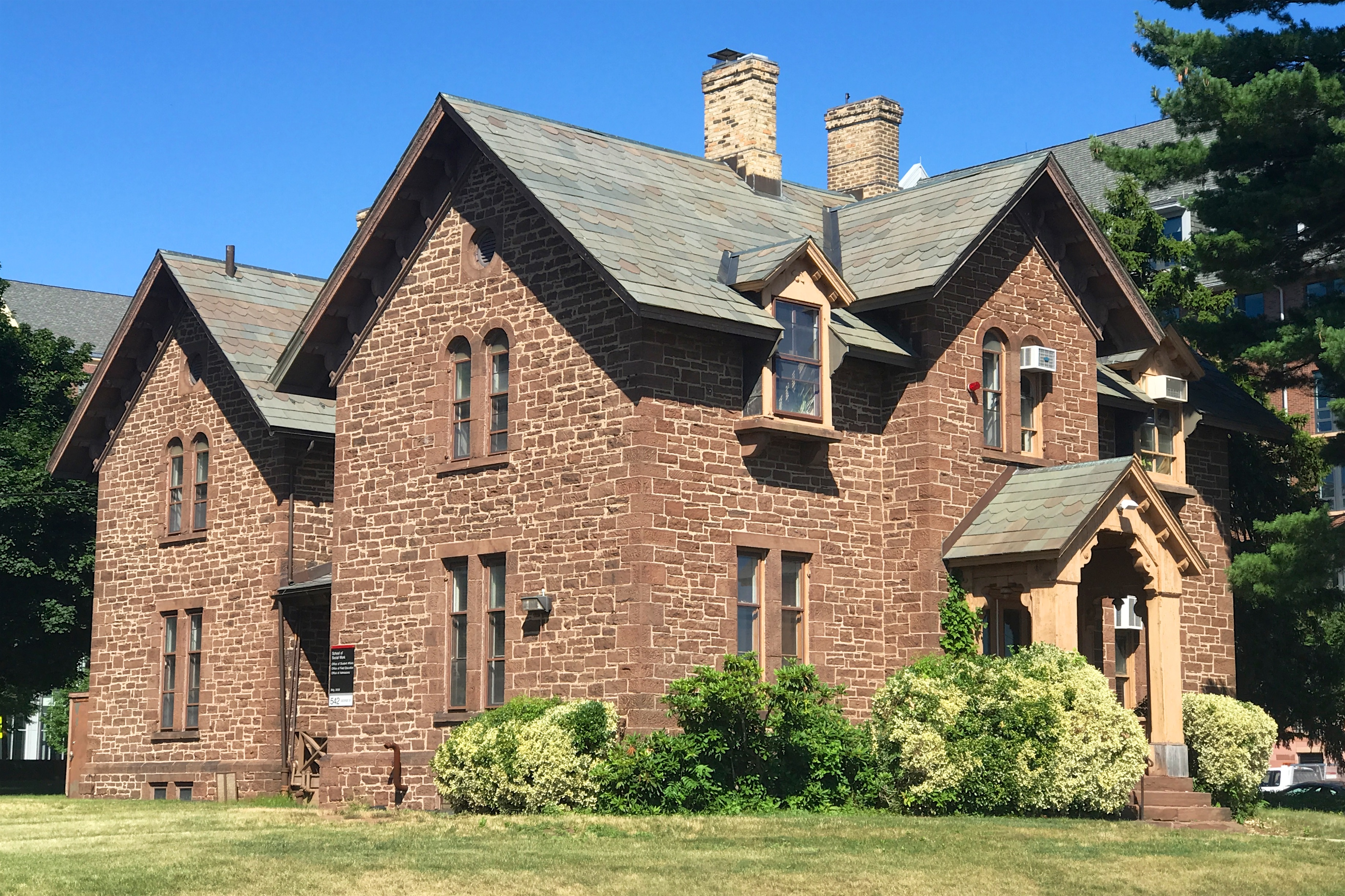
- Demarest House, 2018

- Location within Middlesex County, New Jersey Location within New Jersey Location within the United States
- Location: 542 George Street; New Brunswick, New Jersey
- Coordinates: 40°30′07″N 74°26′47″W
- Area: less than one acre
- Architectural style: Gothic
- NRHP reference No.: 77000884
- NJRHP No.: 1860

Significant dates
- Added to NRHP: August 10, 1977
- Designated NJRHP: February 14, 1977

The Demarest House (also known as the George H. Cook House, the Doolittle house and Riverstede) is a historic building at 542 George Street in New Brunswick, New Jersey on the campus of Rutgers University. It was documented by the Historic American Buildings Survey in 1960. The house was later added to the National Register of Historic Places on August 10, 1977 for its significance in architecture, education, and social history.

== History ==
The house was built by George H. Cook and architect Charles Graham in 1868. The two and one-half story ashlar brownstone building features Victorian Gothic architecture. Cook lived here until his death in 1889. William H. S. Demarest, president of Rutgers College and later president of the New Brunswick Theological Seminary, lived here from 1906 until his death in 1956. Since then the building has served a variety of purposes at Rutgers University. As of 2022 it houses various offices for the Rutgers School of Social Work.

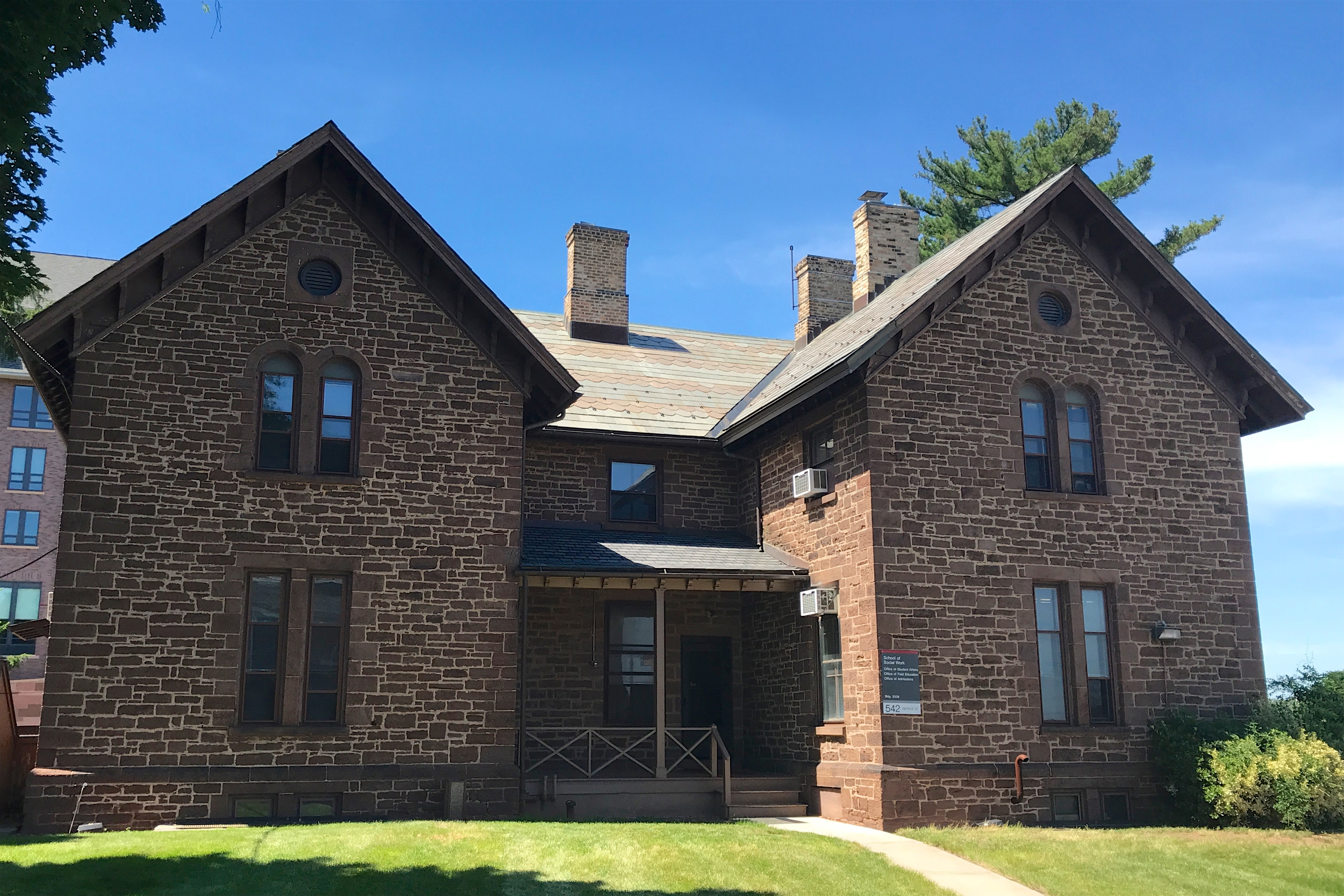
Demarest House, looking north

== See also ==
- National Register of Historic Places listings in Middlesex County, New Jersey
