= Dean Woodbridge =

Dean Woodbridge may refer to:

- Samuel Merrill Woodbridge (1819–1905), dean of Rutgers University
- George Woodbridge (1930–2004), known as "America's Dean of Uniform Illustration"
- Dudley W. Woodbridge, dean of The College of William & Mary Law School
- Frederick James Eugene Woodbridge (1867–1940), dean of Columbia University
