= David D. Demarest =

Reformed minister, theologian, seminary professor

The Reverend David D. Demarest
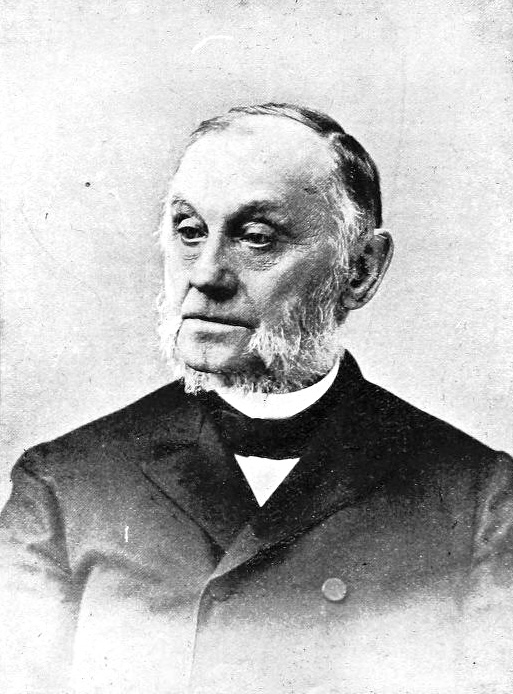
- Demarest in an 1893 publication
- Born: July 30, 1819; Oradell, New Jersey, US
- Died: June 21, 1898 (aged 78); New Brunswick, New Jersey, US
- Burial place: Elmwood Cemetery, North Brunswick, New Jersey, US

David D. Demarest (July 30, 1819 – June 21, 1898) was an American author and theologian from New Brunswick, New Jersey. He was the first professor of pastoral theology and sacred rhetoric at the New Brunswick Theological Seminary, starting in 1865.

== Education and early life ==
Demarest was born in Oradell, New Jersey, on July 30, 1819, of Dutch and Huguenot background. His father, Daniel P. Demarest, died in 1822, when David was only three. He was then raised by his mother, Leah Bogert Demarest, and grandfather, Peter P. Demarest. He is a descendant of David des Marest, an early French settler in Bergen County. He was graduated from Rutgers College (now Rutgers University) in 1837, received a Master's degree (A.M.) from the New Brunswick Theological Seminary in 1840, and a Doctor of Divinity degree (D.D.) from the College of New Jersey (now Princeton University) in 1857. He was awarded an honorary degree (LL.D.) from Rutgers in 1892.

== Ministry ==
After graduation from the seminary, Demarest served at several Reformed Church of America congregations: Catskill, New York; Flatbush, Ulster County, New York; New Brunswick, New Jersey; and Hudson, New York. He started at the Reformed Church of Catskill, filling in for the Rev. James Romeyn for six months. Next, he was pastor of the Flatbush Reformed Church of Saugerties, serving from 1841 to 1843. He was the first pastor of the Second Reformed Church of New Brunswick, starting in 1843 and serving until 1852.

He was president of the General Synod of the Reformed Church in America for the 1858–1859 term. In 1865, a fourth professor position, the Professorship of Pastoral Theology and Sacred Rhetoric, was established at the New Brunswick Theological Seminary. Demarest was the first elected to that professorship and was inaugurated on September 19, 1865, at the First Reformed Church of New Brunswick. He served for thirty-three years.

== Works ==
- Demarest, David D. (1856). Religion in Politics. Hudson, New York: Alex N. Webb.
- Demarest, David D. (1856). History and Characteristics of the Reformed Protestant Dutch Church (3rd ed.). New York, New York: Reformed Church in America.
- Demarest, David D. (1885). Centennial of the Theological Seminary of the Reformed Church in America. 1784–1884. New York, New York: Reformed Church in America.
- Demarest, David D. (1886). The Huguenots on the Hackensack. New Brunswick, New Jersey: Daily Fredonian Steam Printing House.
- Demarest, David D. (1889). The Reformed Church in America: Its Origin, Development and Characteristics (4th ed.). New York, New York: Reformed Church in America.

== Personal life ==
Demarest married Catharine Louisa Nevius on August 19, 1846. They had seven children. Among their children, James S. N. Demarest would become pastor of the Reformed Church of Catskill, and later pastor of the Flatbush Reformed Church from 1876 to 1881. Another son, William Henry Steele Demarest, would become pastor of the Catskill church from 1897 to 1901 and president of Rutgers College from 1906 to 1924. David D. Demarest died on June 21, 1898, at his home in New Brunswick and is buried at the Elmwood Cemetery. On November 17, 1898, a memorial was held at the New Brunswick Historical Club, where he had been president from 1870 until his death.

== See also ==
- List of New Brunswick Theological Seminary people
