= John Baillie McIntosh =

Union Army officer in the American Civil War

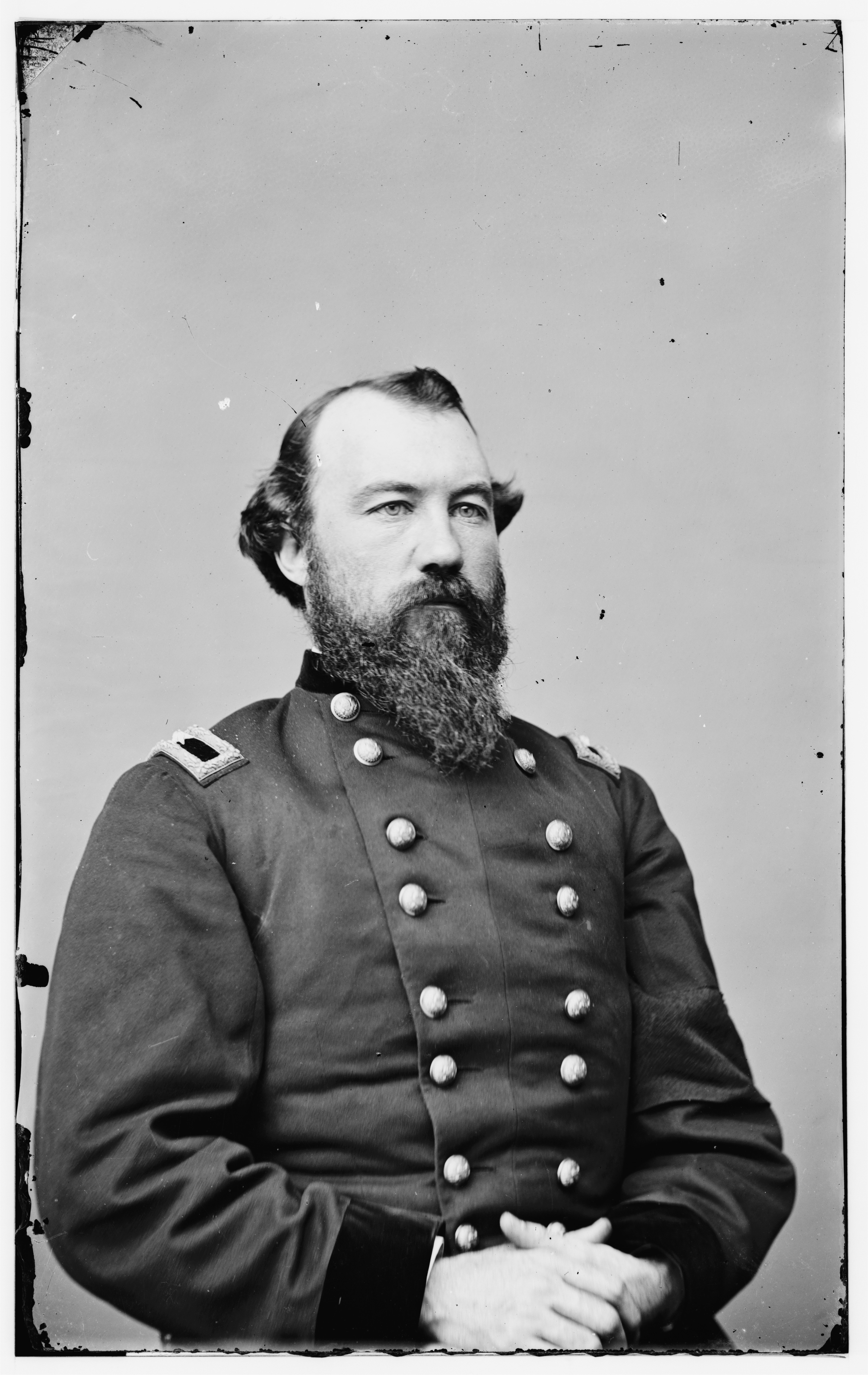
- Born: June 6, 1829; Fort Brooke (Tampa), Florida Territory
- Died: June 29, 1888 (aged 59); New Brunswick, New Jersey
- Burial place: Elmwood Cemetery, North Brunswick, New Jersey
- Military career
- Allegiance: United States of America; Union
- Branch: United States Navy; United States Army: Union Army
- Service years: 1848-1850 (Navy); 1861-1870 (Army)
- Rank: Midshipman; Brigadier General; Brevet Major General
- Unit: 2nd U.S. Cavalry
- Commands: 3rd Pennsylvania Cavalry; 2nd Brigade, 2nd Division, Cavalry Corps, Army of the Potomac; 1st Brigade, 2nd Division, Cavalry Corps, Army of the Potomac; 1st Brigade, 3rd Division, Cavalry Corps, Army of the Potomac
- Conflicts: Mexican-American War; American Civil War

John Baillie McIntosh (June 6, 1829 – June 29, 1888) was a Union Army brigadier general during the American Civil War. His brother, James M. McIntosh, served as a Confederate general until he was killed in the Battle of Pea Ridge.

== Early years ==
McIntosh was born at Fort Brooke (Tampa), Florida Territory, while his father was on active duty in the Army. He served as a midshipman in the United States Navy during the Mexican–American War, and resigned in 1850. Thereafter, McIntosh was in business in New Brunswick, New Jersey.

== Civil War service ==
At the outbreak of the Civil War, he was commissioned a second lieutenant in the 2nd U.S. Cavalry. He was promoted to first lieutenant in April 1862 and served in the Seven Days Battles and the Battle of Antietam, receiving promotion to major between the battles. McIntosh was commissioned colonel of the 3rd Pennsylvania Cavalry on November 15, 1862. In that role he rose to brigade command in the Cavalry Corps of the Army of the Potomac. He led his brigade in the campaign culminating in the Battle of Chancellorsville, winning plaudits from division commander Brig. Gen. William W. Averell.

When Maj. Gen. Alfred Pleasonton reorganized the Cavalry Corps following the Battle of Brandy Station, McIntosh became a brigade commander in the second division led by Brig. Gen. David McM. Gregg. McIntosh was ill after Chancellorsville, but he was present when Gregg's division fought at the Battle of Gettysburg. He distinguished himself in the fight against J.E.B. Stuart on East Cavalry Field on July 3, 1863. When a Confederate attack led by Maj. Gen. Wade Hampton was at its height, McIntosh led some of his men in a flank attack on the attacking troopers. McIntosh was injured by a fall from a horse in September 1863; and, after recovering from his injury, he was on duty in the defenses of Washington, D.C., in XXII Corps until May 1864.

McIntosh returned to the Army of the Potomac in time to be assigned a brigade in the third cavalry division of Brig. Gen. James H. Wilson during the Battle of the Wilderness. He continued in command in the operations of Maj. Gen. Philip Sheridan, including the beginning of the latter's Shenandoah Valley Campaign. McIntosh lost a leg because of a wound he received at the Third Battle of Winchester on September 19, 1864. Later he received brevet promotions of the ranks of major general, U. S. Volunteers, brigadier general, U.S. Army (regular army), and major general, U.S. Army. He retired from the army in 1870.

McIntosh died in New Brunswick. He is buried in the Elmwood Cemetery.

== See also ==
- List of American Civil War generals (Union)
