= George Hammell Cook =

American geologist

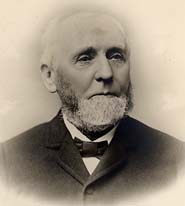
- Born: January 5, 1818; Hanover, New Jersey
- Died: September 22, 1889 (aged 71); New Brunswick, New Jersey
- Spouse: Mary Halsey Thomas (1821-?)
- Children: Paul Cook (1847-?), Sarah Cook (1849-?). John Willard Cook (1852-?), Emma Willard Cook (1854-?), Anne Bigelow Cook (1857-?), Robert Anderson Cook (1861-?)

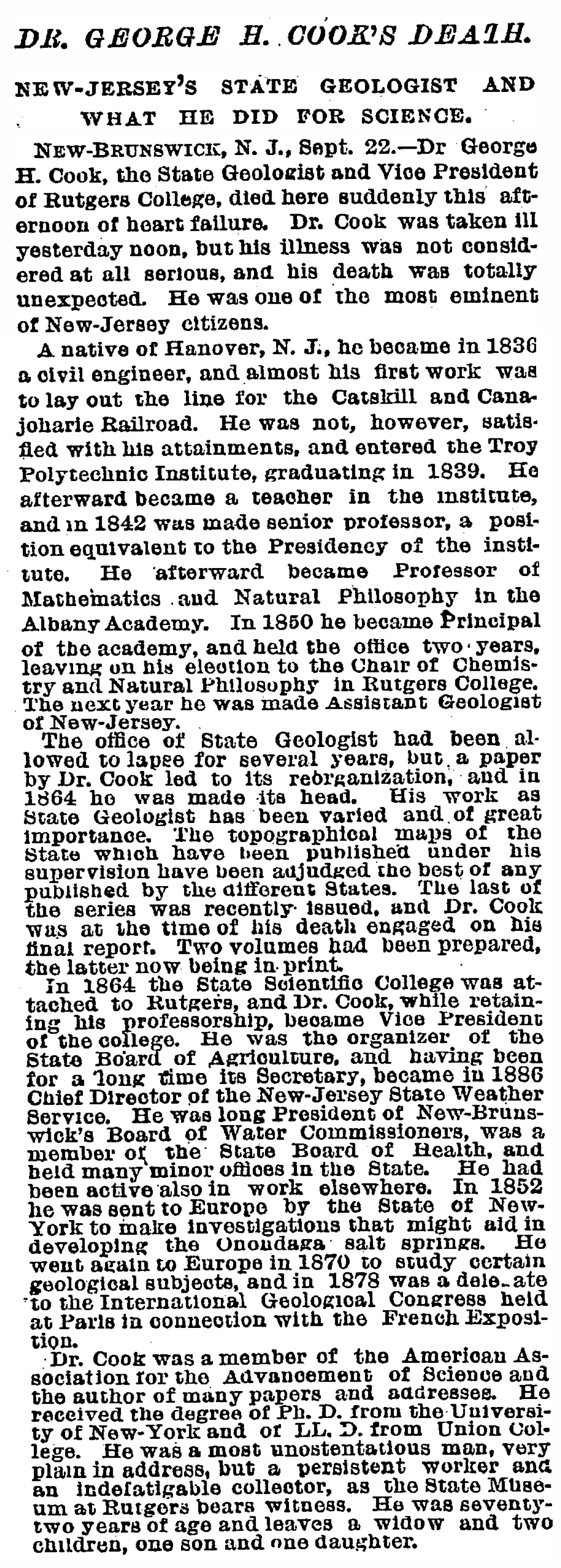
New York Times obituary

George Hammell Cook (January 5, 1818 – September 22, 1889) was the state geologist of New Jersey and vice president of Rutgers College. His geological survey of New Jersey became the predecessor for the U.S. Geological Survey.

== Biography ==
He was born in Hanover Township, New Jersey, on January 5, 1818, to John Cook and Sarah Munn. He married Mary Halsey Thomas on March 23, 1846. He served as the principal of The Albany Academy in Albany, New York from 1850 to 1852.

He came to Rutgers in 1853 and was appointed professor of chemistry. His teaching duties also included mathematics and theology. Among his first research projects was the chemical analysis of marl. This research led him to determine better places to mine marl, which led to his appointment as the assistant state geologist. He published a geological survey of New Jersey to replace the one made in 1840.

In 1864 he was appointed as the state geologist of New Jersey.

He had become a vice president of Rutgers College and was a fellow of the American Association for the Advancement of Science. He died on September 22, 1889, in New Brunswick, New Jersey.

== Legacy ==
Cook College at Rutgers University was named after him, as is the George Hammell Cook Distinguished Alumni Award.

== Timeline ==
- 1818 Born in Hanover, New Jersey, on January 18, 1818
- 1836 Surveyed Canajoharie and Catskill Railroad
- 1839 Graduated from the Rensselaer Polytechnic Institute
- 1839 Tutor at Rensselaer Polytechnic Institute
- 1842-1846 Senior Professor at Rensselaer Polytechnic Institute
- 1848 Professor of Math and Natural Philosophy at The Albany Academy
- 1848-1850 Glass-making in Albany, New York
- 1851-1853 Principal of The Albany Academy
- 1853 Chairman of Chemistry and Natural Sciences at Rutgers College
- 1864 Elected as a member to the American Philosophical Society
- 1864-1889 Vice President of Rutgers College
- 1864-1889 State Geologist of New Jersey
- 1872 Published first edition of Geology of New Jersey
- 1879 Appointed Director of the State Agricultural Experiment Station
- 1889 Died in New Brunswick, New Jersey, on September 22, 1889, due to heart failure

== Publications ==
- Cook, George Hammell (1868). Geology of New Jersey. Daily Advertiser Off.

== See also ==
- Demarest House – his Riverstede home at Rutgers
