= Gregg A. Mast =

Gregg Alan Mast
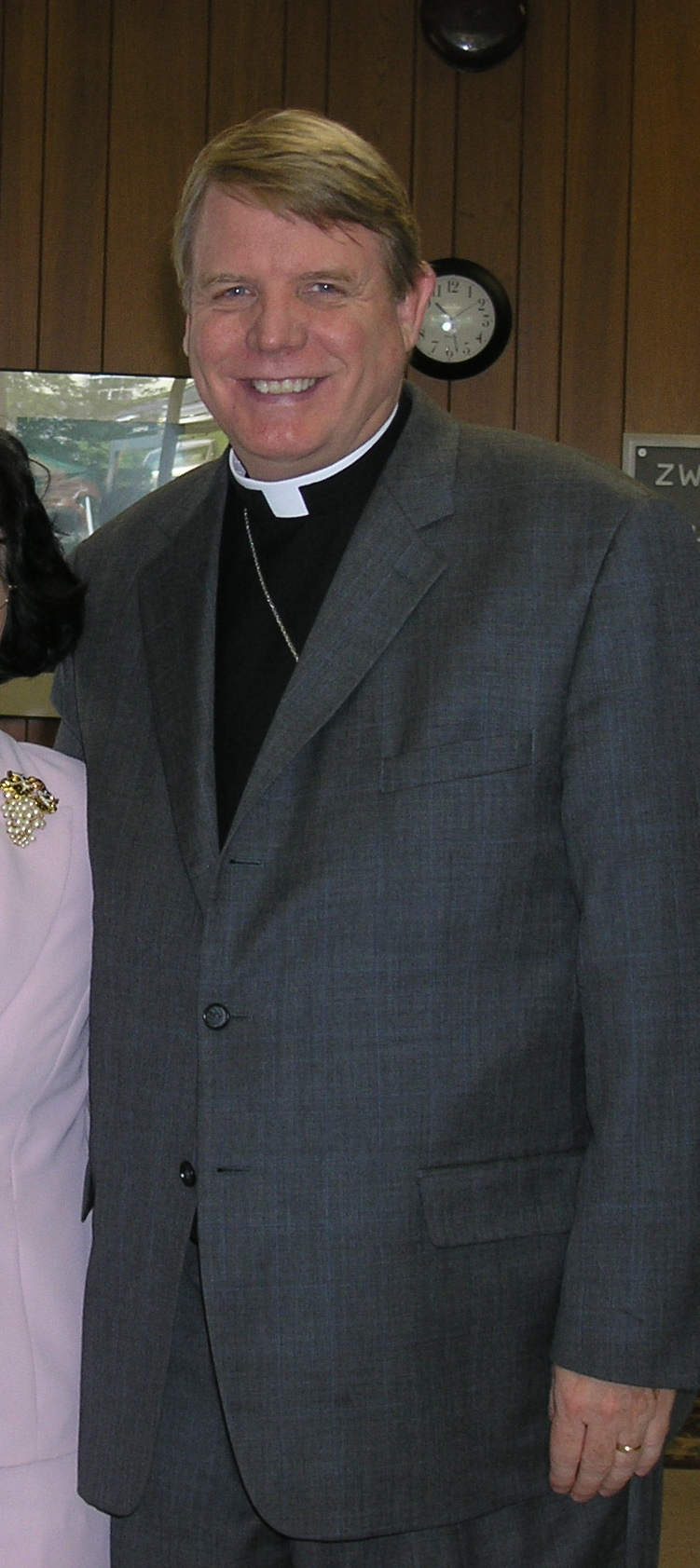
- Mast at a reception for graduating students, 2007
- Born: February 7, 1952; Grand Rapids, Michigan, U.S.
- Died: April 27, 2020 (aged 68); Albany, New York, U.S.
- Occupations: Reformed clergyman, scholar, and seminary president

Academic background
- Education: Hope College, New Brunswick Theological Seminary
- Alma mater: Drew University (PhD)
- Thesis: The Eucharistic Service of the Catholic Apostolic Church and Its Influence on Reformed Liturgical Renewals of the Nineteenth Century (1985)

Academic work
- Discipline: Biblical studies
- Institutions: New Brunswick Theological Seminary

Gregg Alan Mast was a Reformed clergyman, scholar, and seminary president. Mast was the author of six books on Christian practice and theology, and the editor of a collection of sermons by Reformed minister and theologian Howard G. Hageman

From 2006 to 2017, Mast served as the fourteenth president of the New Brunswick Theological Seminary located in New Brunswick, New Jersey, in the United States—one of two seminaries affiliated with the Reformed Church in America. Mast has overseen the seminary in a time of transition as it built a new, smaller, "technologically smart and environmentally green" campus on College Avenue and Seminary Place in New Brunswick that was completed in 2014. This move—part of a large-scale redevelopment of the College Avenue area of New Brunswick by New Brunswick Development Corporation (DEVCO), Rutgers University and the seminary—was made in response to the seminary's declining enrollment, financial constraints and to replace an aging campus with a modern, environmentally-friendly campus.

Mast was born in 1952 and grew up in Jenison, Michigan. In 1974, Mast earned a Bachelor of Arts (B.A.) degree majoring in religion from Hope College in Holland, Michigan. Pursuing a vocation in the Christian ministry, he received a Master of Divinity (M.Div.) from the New Brunswick Theological Seminary and was ordained as a clergyman in the Reformed Church in America in 1976. He earned a Master of Philosophy (M.Phil.) in 1981 and Doctor of Philosophy (Ph.D.) in Liturgical Studies in 1985 from Drew University in Madison, New Jersey. His doctoral dissertation was titled The Eucharistic Service of the Catholic Apostolic Church and Its Influence on Reformed Liturgical Renewals of the Nineteenth Century (1985) which was later published as a book in 1999.

Mast has served congregations in Johannesburg, South Africa, in Newark and Irvington in New Jersey, and Albany, New York. In addition to New Brunswick Theological Seminary, Mast has taught on the faculties of Westminster Choir College, Siena College, St. Bernard's Institute, and as a guest lecturer at the Nkhoma Theological Seminary in Malawi. He served as President of the General Synod of the Reformed Church in America from 1999-2000. He died on April 27, 2020, of complications from COVID-19.

He notably said, "Worship leaders need to strive for a tone that is both relevant and dignified, personal without being private, expressive as well as evocative, and contemporary while embracing the eternal."

He also said, "Worship should never remain static. As the congregation changes, so do its needs. The actions of pastor and people working together are critical in creating dynamic worship. After all, the word liturgy means, quite simply, 'the work of the people.’ If our liturgy, and our worship, is to be corporately offered to God, then it is important that worship committees be at the forefront of its corporate creation."

== Works ==
=== Thesis ===
- ——— (1985). The Eucharistic Service of the Catholic Apostolic Church and Its Influence on Reformed Liturgical Renewals of the Nineteenth Century (Ph.D.). New York: Drew University. OCLC 15604123.

=== Books ===
- Mast, Gregg A. (1989). Living Free: ten guides to service, a study of the Ten Commandments. Grandville, MI: Reformed Church Press. OCLC 36098768.
- ——— (1990). Christian Baptism. Grandville, MI: Reformed Church Press. OCLC 84009447.
- ———; Hageman, Howard G. (1995). Our Reformed Church. New York: Reformed Church Press. OCLC 38541158.
- ——— (1997). And Grace Shines Through: A Journey of Faith Through the Ordinary Stories Of Our Lives. New York: Reformed Church Press. ISBN 978-0-916-46605-3. OCLC 36470166.
- ——— (1998). In Remembrance and Hope: The Ministry and Vision of Howard G. Hageman. The Historical Series of the Reformed Church in America. Vol. 27. Grand Rapids, MI: Eerdmans. ISBN 978-0-8028-4613-6. OCLC 39217464.
- ——— (1999). The Eucharistic Service of the Catholic Apostolic Church and Its Influence on Reformed Liturgical Renewals of the Nineteenth Century. Drew University Studies in Liturgy. Vol. 7. New York: Scarecrow Press. ISBN 978-0-8108-3553-5. OCLC 39181942. published version of doctoral dissertation
- ———, ed. (2000). Raising the Dead: Sermons of Howard G. Hageman. Historical series of the Reformed Church in America. Vol. 34. Grand Rapids, MI: Eerdmans. ISBN 978-0-8028-4884-0. OCLC 46946493.

== See also ==
- List of New Brunswick Theological Seminary people
