= Frederick Barnett Kilmer =

American pharmacist

Frederick Barnett Kilmer (15 December 1851 – 28 December 1934) was an American pharmacist, author, public health activist and the director of Scientific Laboratories for the Johnson & Johnson company from 1889 to 1934.

== Early life ==
Kilmer was born 15 December 1851 to Charles Kilmer and Mary Anne (née Langdon) Kilmer in Chapinville, Connecticut (now Taconic (Salisbury), Litchfield County, Connecticut).

=== Personal life and training ===
Kilmer married Annis Eliza "Annie" Kilburn (1852–1932) on 25 December 1874 at Sunbury, Pennsylvania, with whom he had four children, all of whom died young, two in infancy, predeceasing their parents: Anda Frederick "Andy" Kilmer (1873–1899), Ellen Annie Kilmer (1875–1876), Charles Willoughby Kilmer (1880–1880), and writer and poet Joyce Kilmer (1886–1918).

Kilmer attended the public schools of Birmingham, New Jersey, before entering the Wyoming Seminary at Kingston, Pennsylvania, and subsequently the New York College of Pharmacy. He completed special courses in chemistry at Columbia, Yale and Rutgers Universities, and another under Hoffman. A Master in Pharmacy was conferred on him by the Philadelphia College of Pharmacy and Science in 1920.

== Professional career ==
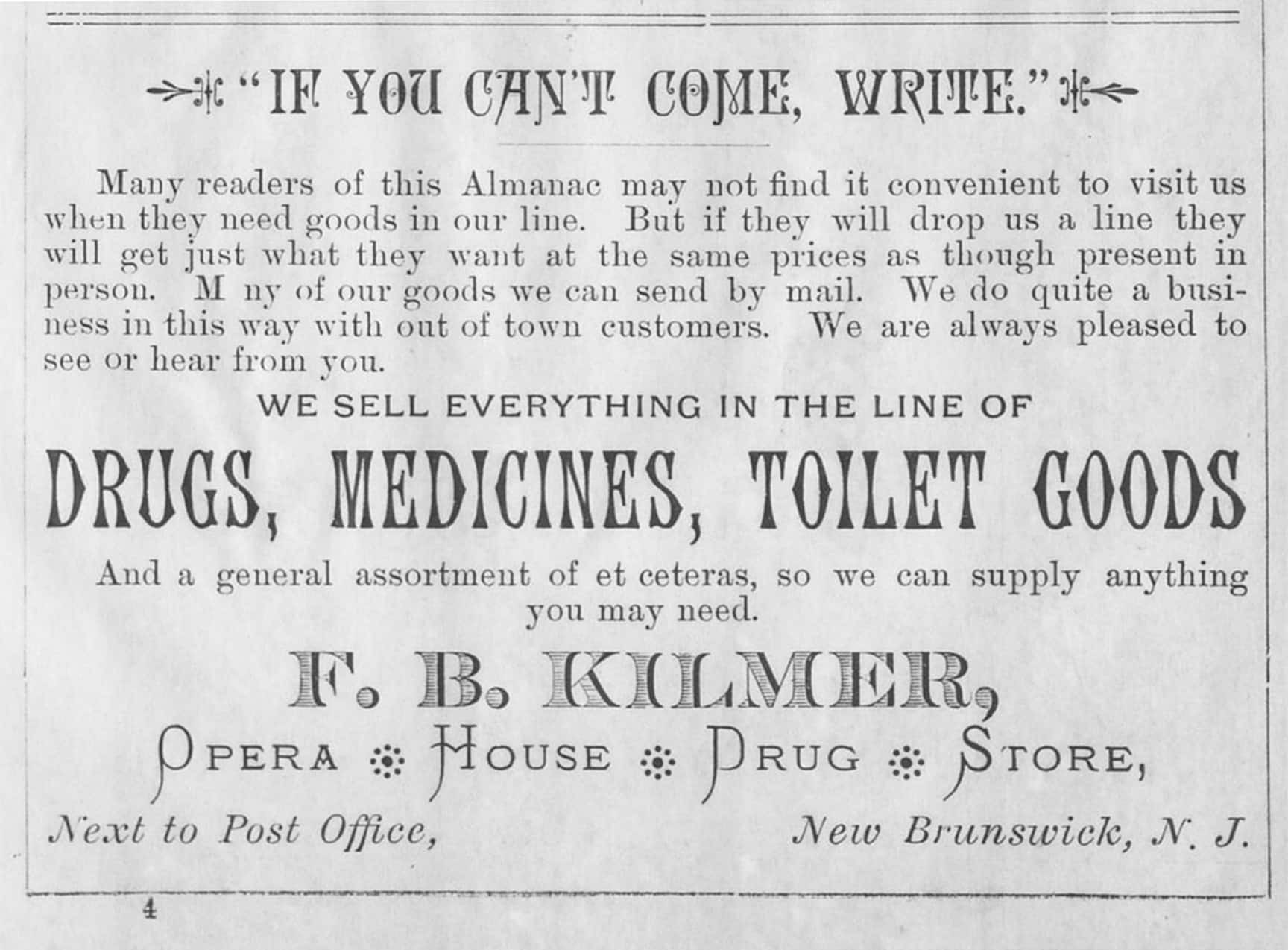
1888 advertisement for mail order from Kilmer's Opera House Drug Store

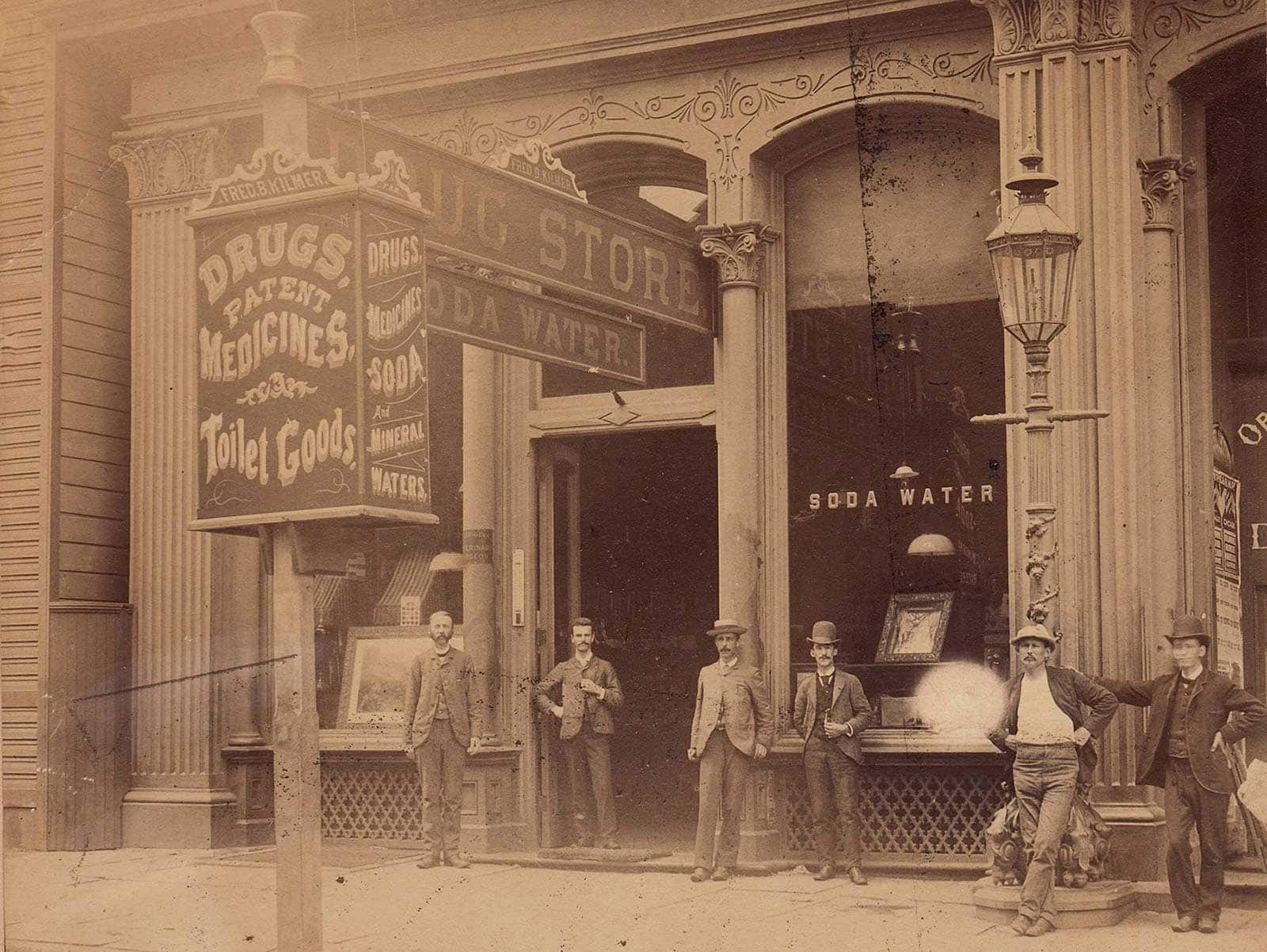
Opera House Drug Store in 1889

Kilmer cultivated and studied plants for medicinal properties, especially ginger, kola, papaw and belladonna, and implemented solutions to problems in water and milk supplies.

Kilmer was a:

- Member of the Society of Chemical Industry, Royal Society of Arts, North British Academy of Arts, New Brunswick Historical Society, New Brunswick Scientific Society, American Chemical Society, American Institute of Chemical Engineers and American Public Health Association.
- Vice-president of the American Drug Manufacturer's Association, American Pharmaceutical Association, Society of Economic Biologists of England, Institute Arzenmittelhere of Braunschweig, Societe Quimica Agricola of Buenos Ayers and Institute of Jamaica.
- President of the New Brunswick Board of Health.
- Advisor to the New Jersey State Board of Health.

Kilmer supported the Republican Party, and belonged to two clubs, the Chemists of New York City and the Union of New Brunswick. He was also a vestryman for the Christ Episcopal Church and member of the standing committee of the Diocese of New Jersey. He had previously studied at the Wyoming Seminary at Kingston, Pennsylvania.

Kilmer practiced his pharmacology in Binghamton, New York, Plymouth, Pennsylvania and Morristown, New Jersey; before moving to New Brunswick, New Jersey where he managed his own pharmacy.

Kilmer was a foundation employee of the pharmaceutical company Johnson and Johnson in 1886, and was an early advocate of the First Aid movement.

== Publications ==
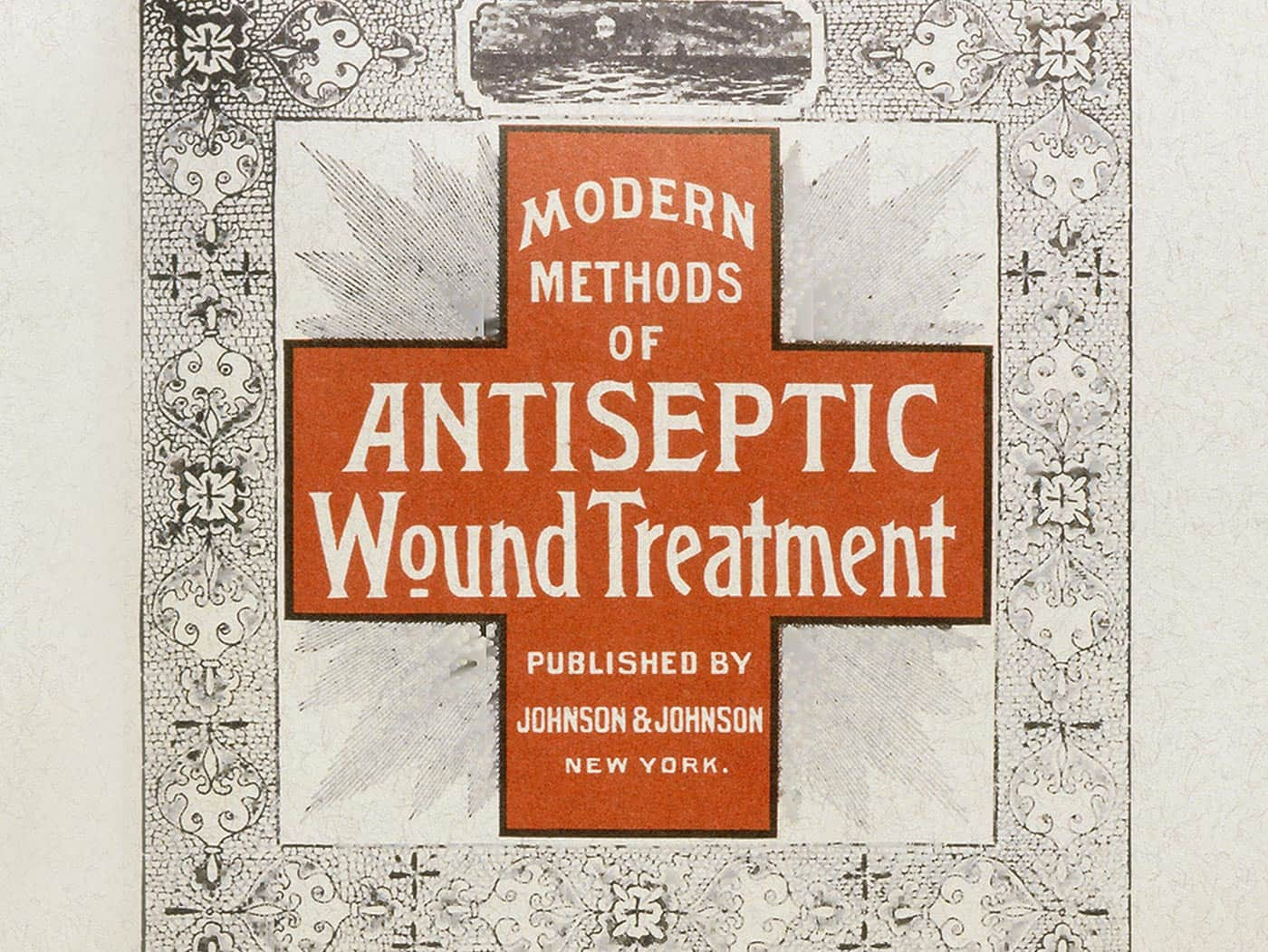
Modern Methods of Antiseptic Wound Treatment

Kilmer published a booklet, Modern Methods of Antiseptic Wound Treatment in 1888, popularizing the knowledge of antiseptic methods for treating wounds with an appendix of appropriate company products, and co-wrote the "Standard First Aid Manual" in 1901 also for the company.

== Directorship ==
Kilmer severed his connection with his pharmacy in 1889 on becoming director of the Scientific Laboratories of Johnson & Johnson until his death in 1934.

Kilmer was subsequently responsible for Johnson & Johnson's Baby Powder. In those early days, the company made medicated plasters which could irritate when removed. He suggested sending customers a small container of Italian talc to soothe their skin. Satisfied customers soon discovered the powder also soothed their babies' bottoms, and in 1893 the company sold the first tins of the famous baby powder.

== Death ==
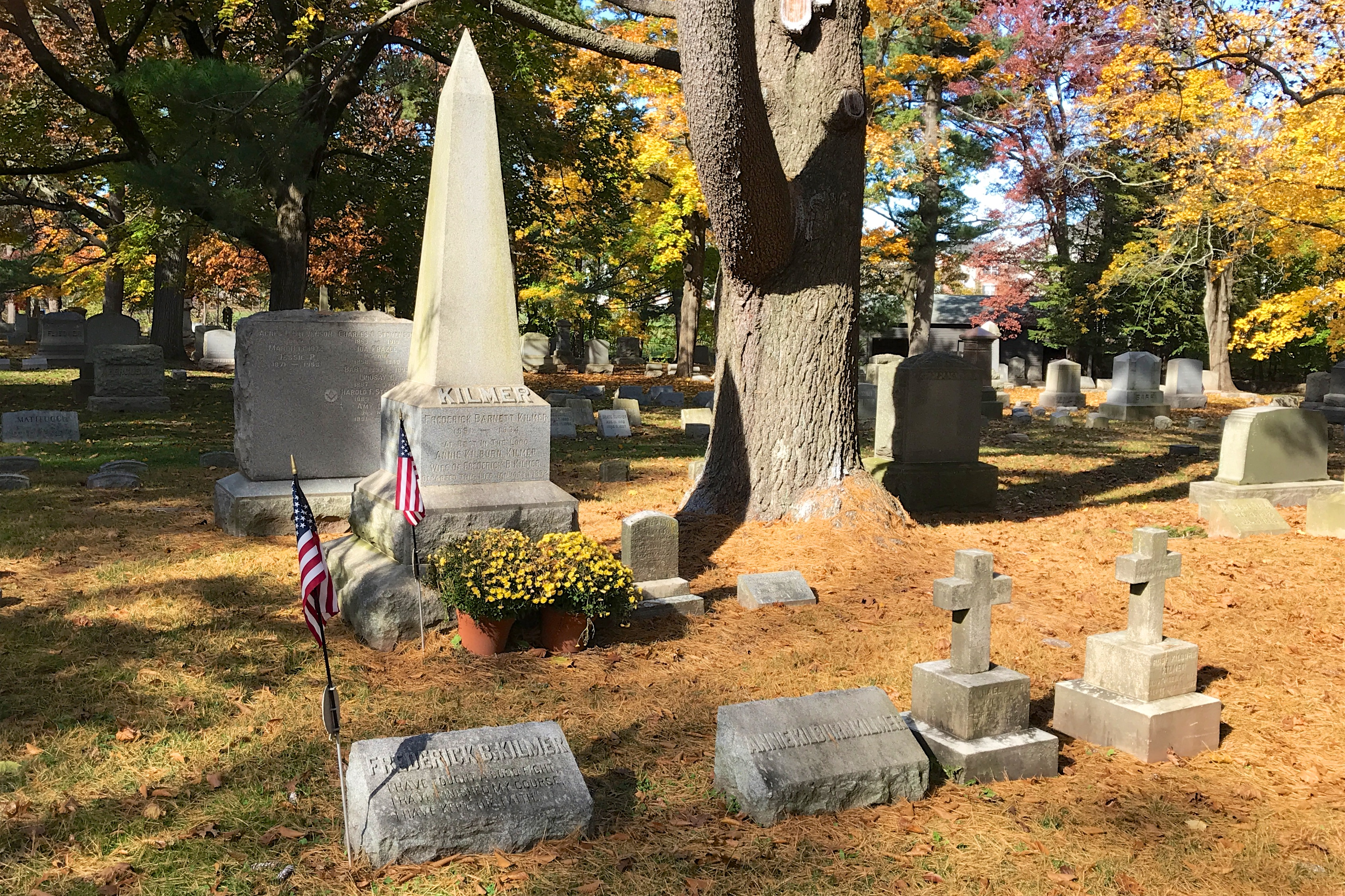
Kilmer family plot at the Elmwood Cemetery

Kilmer died 28 December 1934, aged 83, in New Brunswick, New Jersey. He was buried three days later in Elmwood Cemetery, North Brunswick, New Jersey.
