= Flatbush Reformed Church (Saugerties, New York) =

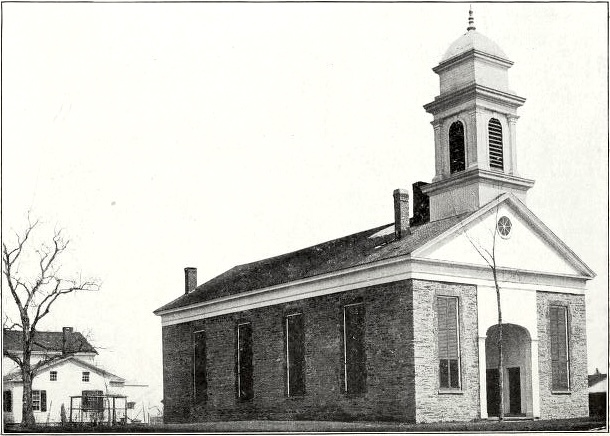
- View in 1907
- Flatbush Reformed Church
- 42°1′22″N 73°57′18″W
- Address: 1844 NY 32, Saugerties, New York
- Country: United States
- Denomination: Reformed Church in America

History
- Founded: 1807

Architecture
- Completed: 1808

The Flatbush Reformed Church is located at 1844 NY 32 in the Flatbush section of the town of Saugerties in Ulster County, New York, United States. The Reformed congregation was founded in 1807 and the stone church building constructed in 1808. The current pastor is the Rev. Jennifer Bendelius.

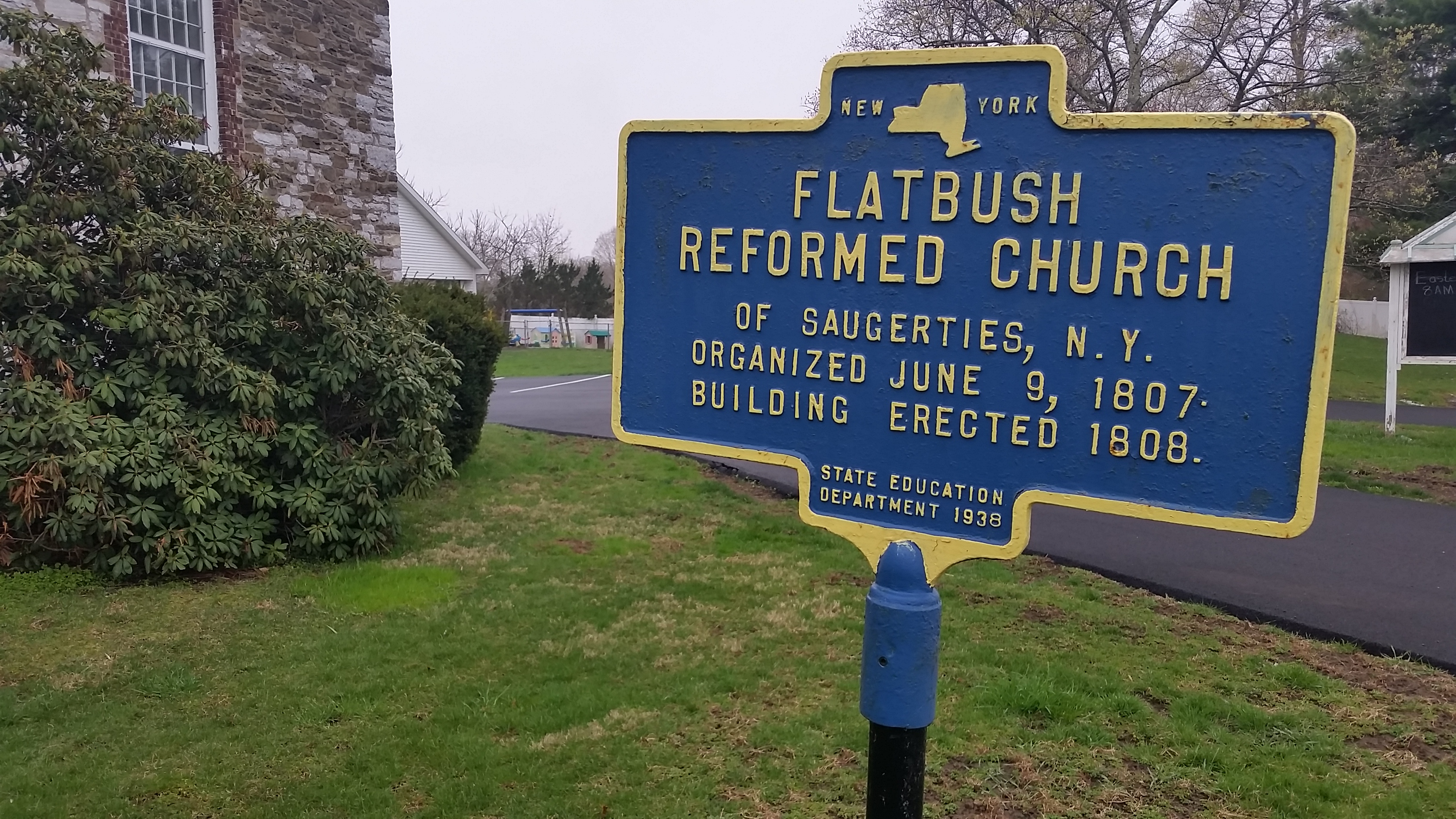
New York State historic marker
