= Samuel Merrill Woodbridge =

Reformed minister, theologian, seminary professor

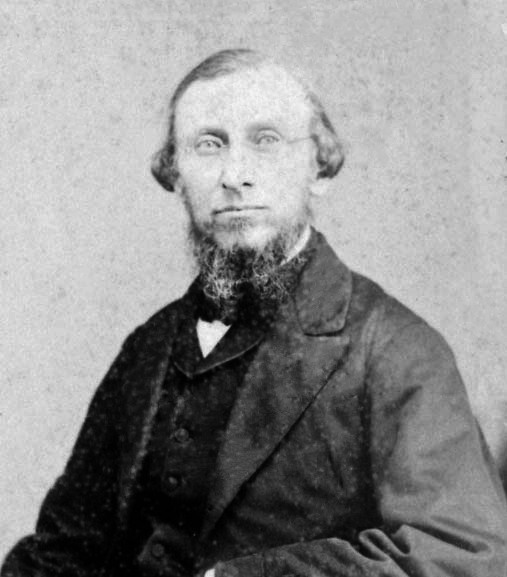
The Rev. Samuel Merrill Woodbridge, c. late 1860s

The Reverend Samuel Merrill Woodbridge, D.D., LL.D. (April 5, 1819 – June 23, 1905) was an American clergyman, theologian, author, and college professor. A graduate of New York University and the New Brunswick Theological Seminary, Woodbridge preached for sixteen years as a clergyman in the Reformed Church in America.

After settling in New Brunswick, New Jersey, he taught for 44 years as professor of ecclesiastical history and church government at the New Brunswick Theological Seminary, and for seven years as professor of "metaphysics and philosophy of the human mind" at Rutgers College (now Rutgers, The State University of New Jersey) in New Brunswick. Woodbridge later led the New Brunswick seminary as Dean and President of the Faculty from 1883 to 1901. He was the author of three books and several published sermons and addresses covering various aspects of Christian faith, theology, church history and government.

== Biography ==
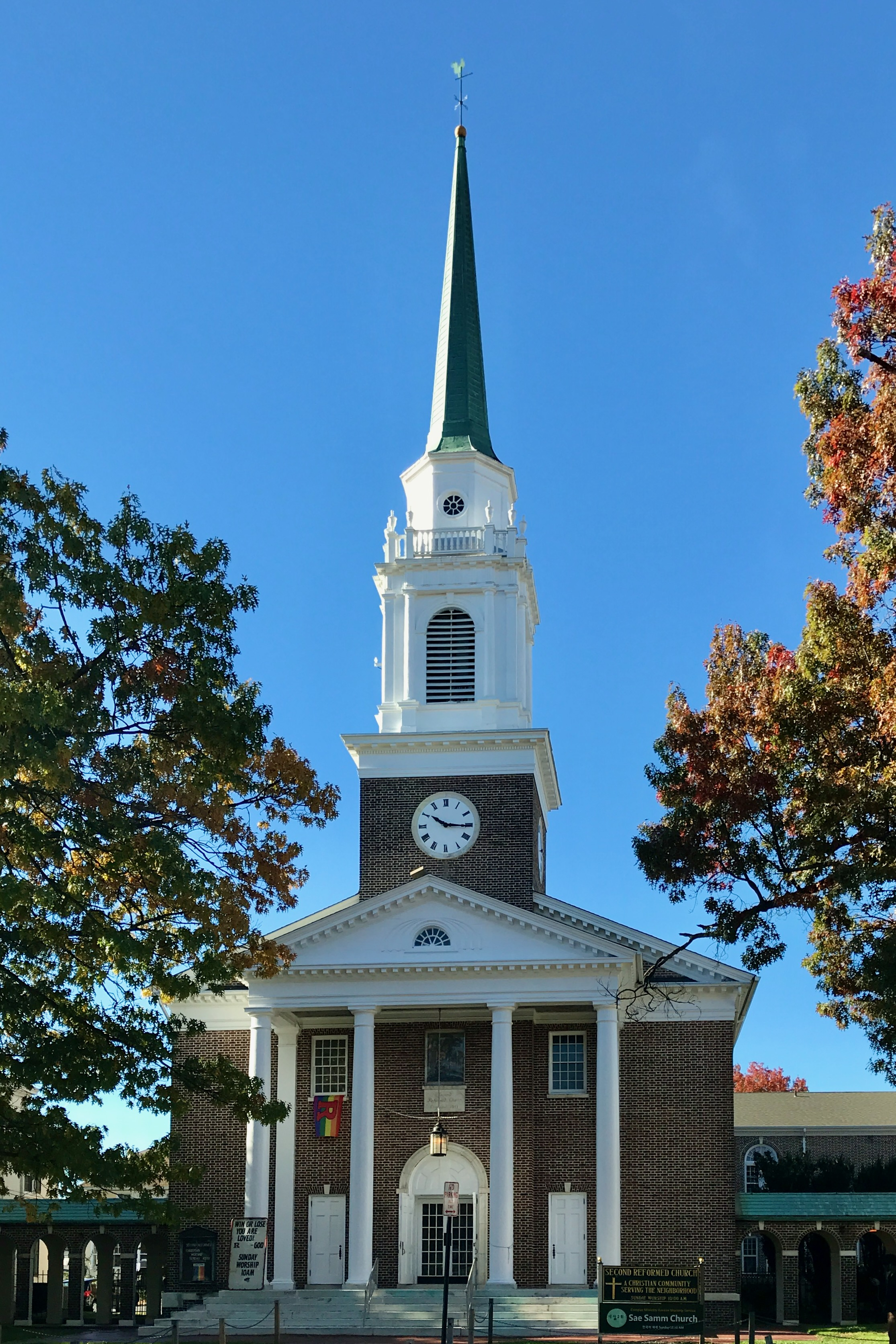
Woodbridge served the Second Reformed Church in New Brunswick, New Jersey, for five years from 1852 to 1857.

Samuel Merrill Woodbridge was born April 5, 1819, in Greenfield, Massachusetts. He was the third of six children born to the Rev. Sylvester Woodbridge, D.D. (1790–1863) and Elizabeth Gould (died in 1851). According to a genealogical chart published in Munsey's Magazine in 1907, Woodbridge was in the eleventh generation of a family of clergymen dating back to the late 15th century. The earliest clergyman in this ancestral line, the Rev. John Woodbridge (born in 1493), was a follower of John Wycliffe.

Woodbridge attended New York University, receiving a Bachelor of Arts (A.B.) degree in 1838. As an undergraduate student, Woodbridge was a member of the university's secretive, all-male Eucleian Society and was elected to Phi Beta Kappa. He was awarded a Master of Arts (A.M.) from the New Brunswick Theological Seminary in 1841 and was installed as a minister by the Reformed Church's Classis of New York, a governing body overseeing churches within the region. At this time, his alma mater, New York University, promoted his bachelor's degree to a Master of Arts. After his graduation from seminary, he served as pastor at the South Reformed Dutch Church in South Brooklyn (1841–49), at the Second Reformed Church in Coxsackie, New York (1849–52), and at the Second Reformed Church in New Brunswick, New Jersey (1852–57).

In December 1857, Woodbridge was appointed to the faculty of two schools in New Brunswick, New Jersey. He would serve 44 years as a professor of ecclesiastical history and church government at New Brunswick Theological Seminary (from 1857 to 1901) and for seven years as a professor of "Metaphysics and Philosophy of the Human Mind" at Rutgers College (from 1857 to 1864). (Note: Raven's Catalogue refers to his appointment as "Professor of Mental Philosophy.") Both schools were then affiliated with the Protestant Dutch Reformed faith. (Note: Rutgers would later become a nonsectarian public university in 1945.) He was appointed by the Synod to a vacancy in both professorates caused by the death of the Rev. John Ludlow, D.D. (1793–1857), on September 8, 1857. During his tenure at the seminary, Woodbridge also provided instruction in the areas of pastoral, didactic and polemic theology—often when there were vacancies amongst the faculty.

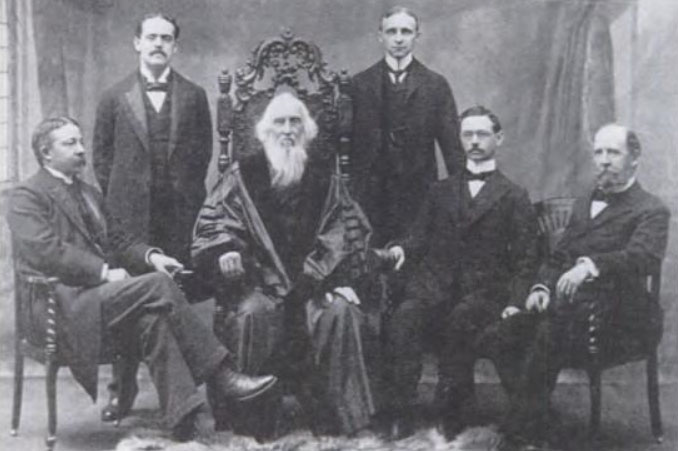
Emeritus professor Woodbridge (seated, center, with white beard and robes) with the seminary's faculty, circa 1904

In 1883, the church's General Synod decided that the "oldest professor in service in the Theological Seminary at New Brunswick be styled Dean of the Seminary, and to him shall be entrusted the discipline of the Institution, according to such regulations as may be agreed upon by the Faculty." Woodbridge led the seminary as its first Dean of the Seminary, and subsequently as President of the Faculty until his retirement in 1901. Both positions were predecessors to the present seminary president. During his career, Woodbridge received honorary degrees from Union College (D.D. 1858) and from Rutgers College (A.M., 1841; D.D., 1857; LL.D. 1883). He retired from teaching in 1901 as an emeritus professor, at the age of 82.

== Marriages ==
Woodbridge married twice. His first marriage was to Caroline Bergen (who died in 1861) in February 1845; the couple had one daughter, Caroline Woodbridge (born 1845). On December 20, 1866, he married his second wife, Anna Wittaker Dayton (1823–1920), with whom he had two daughters, Anna Dayton Woodbridge (born 1869) and Mary Elizabeth Woodbridge (born 1872).

== Death ==
Woodbridge died at the age of 86 on June 23, 1905, in New Brunswick, New Jersey. He was interred in a family plot in the Elmwood Cemetery, North Brunswick, New Jersey.

Church historian Charles Edward Corwin recorded that Woodbridge was described as having a strong personality that "made dry subjects to glow with life," adding that he "was very firm in the faith but his loving heart made him kindly even toward those whose opinion he considered dangerous."

== Works ==
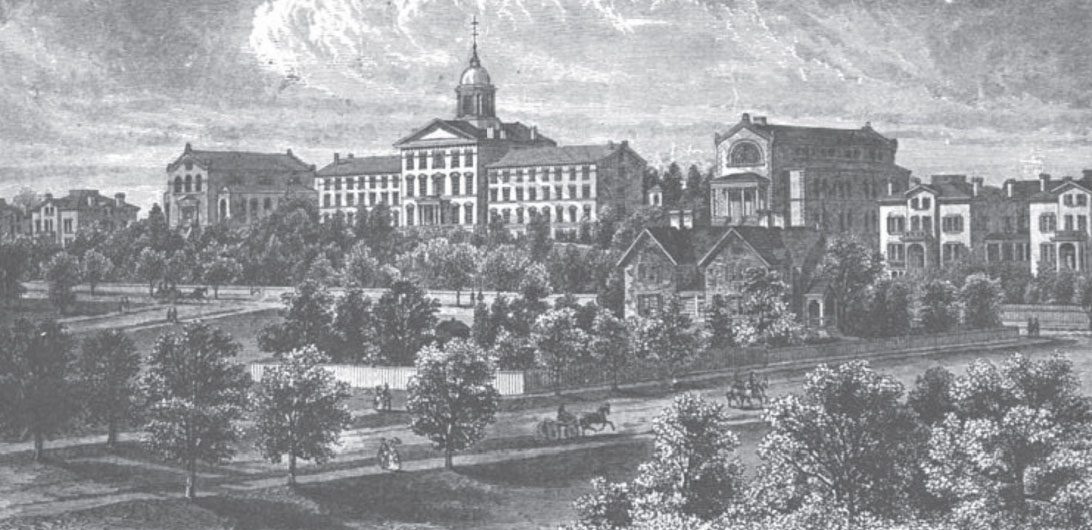
An 1880 print of the New Brunswick Theological Seminary campus, where Woodbridge taught for 44 years

=== Books ===
- 1872: Analysis of Systematic Theology (1st Edition)
- 1883: Analysis of Systematic Theology (2nd Edition)
- 1895: Manual of Church History
- 1896: Synopsis of Church Government (Note: Corwin's Manual gives the title Text-Book of Church Government. Other sources list it as Manual of Church Government. No other details available on this work.)

=== Sermons and discourses ===
Various sermons, addresses, and discourses given in public by Rev. Woodbridge have been printed in newspapers and periodicals, as part of a collection of addresses in books, and as separately published pamphlets. These smaller works include:

- 1853: "Principles of Our Government: A Thanksgiving Discourse" (Note: This work is mentioned in an enumeration of Woodbridge's writings listed in Corwin's Manual. No other details available on this work.)
- 1856: "Sermon on Human Government", printed in the New Brunswick Fredonian (Note: This work is mentioned as published in the New Brunswick Fredonian (likely the New-Brunswick Daily Fredonian) according to an enumeration of Woodbridge's writings listed in Corwin's Manual. No other details available on this work.)
- 1857: "Inaugural Discourse as Professor of Ecclesiastical History" (Note: This work is mentioned in an enumeration of Woodbridge's writings listed in Corwin's Manual. No other details available on this work.)
- 1857: "On the Family", printed in The Christian Intelligencer
- 1865: "Power of the Bible", printed in The National Preacher and Village Pulpit
- 1867: "Address" published in Richard Holloway Steele's Historical Discourse delivered at the Celebration of the One Hundred and Fiftieth Anniversary of the First Reformed Dutch Church
- 1869: "Address" included in Proceedings at the Centennial Anniversary of the Dedication of the North Dutch Church, May 25, 1869
- 1871: "Discourse on Benevolence given before the General Synod at Albany", printed in Christian Intelligencer (Note: This work is described as being printed in the June 1871 issue of The Christian Intelligencer of the Reformed Dutch Church according to an enumeration of Woodbridge's work listed in Corwin's Manual. No other details available on this work.)
- 1875: Faith: It's True Position in the Life of Man: A Discourse, preached November 22d, 1874, in the chapel of Rutgers College
- 1885: "Historical Theology: An Address", included in David D. Demarest's Centennial of the Theological Seminary of the Reformed Church in America, formerly the Reformed Protestant Dutch Church, 1784–1884
- 1894: "Characteristics of Dr. Campbell", included in A Memorial of Rev. William Henry Campbell, D.D., LL.D., Late President of Rutgers College
- 1897: "Address by Professor Woodbridge", included in Fortieth Anniversary of the Inauguration of the Rev. S. M. Woodbridge, D.D., LL.D., as Professor in the Theological Seminary of the Reformed (Dutch) Church in America at New Brunswick, 1857–1897

== See also ==
- List of New Brunswick Theological Seminary people
- List of New York University alumni
- List of Rutgers University people
