= Second Reformed Church (New Brunswick, New Jersey) =

Second Reformed Church of New Brunswick
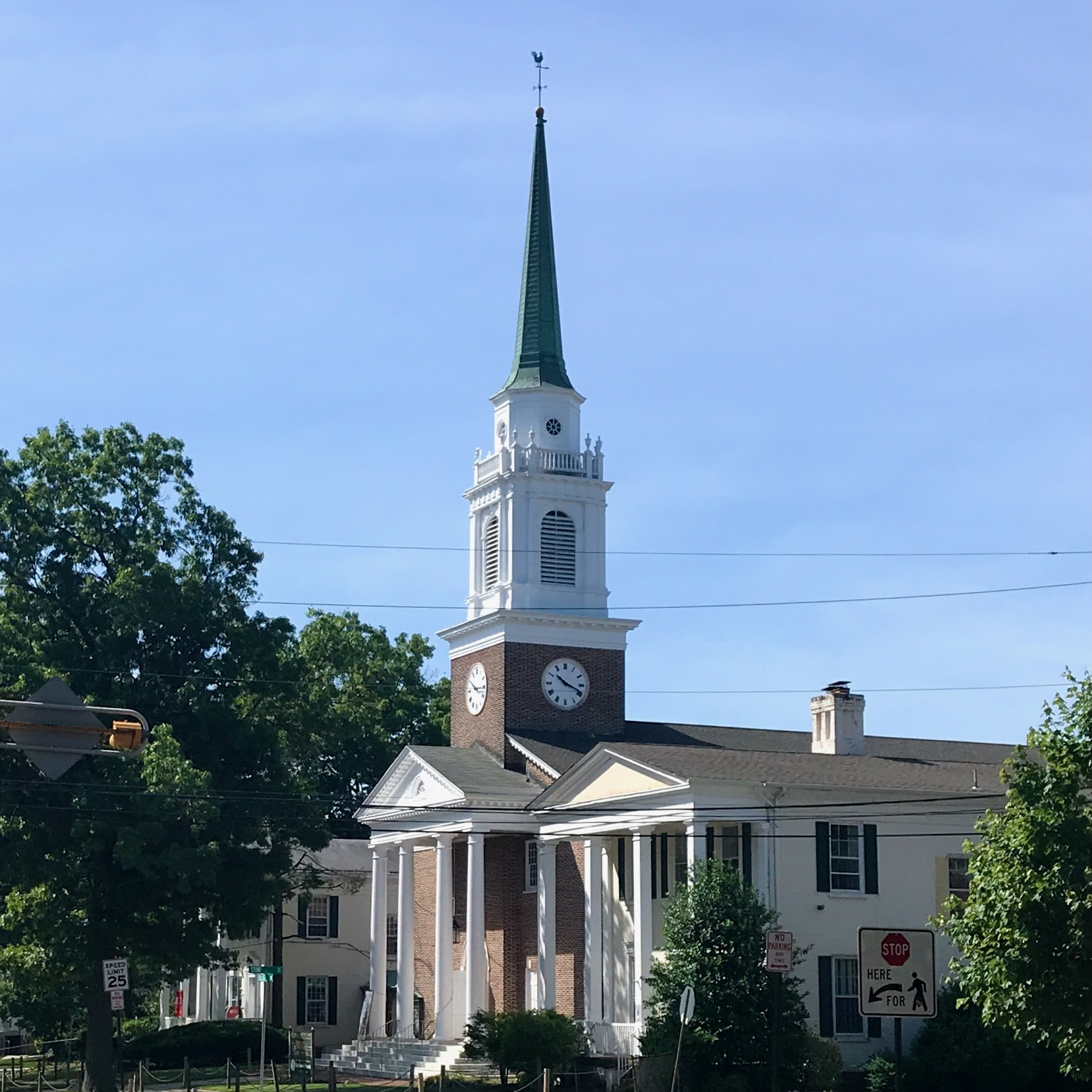
- Church complex
- Second Reformed Church of New Brunswick
- 40°30′4.7″N 74°27′1.7″W
- Address: 100 College Avenue, New Brunswick, New Jersey
- Country: United States
- Denomination: Reformed Church in America

History
- Founded: February 14, 1843
- Dedicated: 1928

Architecture
- Architect: Ludlow and Peabody

The Second Reformed Church is located at 100 College Avenue in the city of New Brunswick in Middlesex County, New Jersey, United States. The Reformed congregation was founded on February 14, 1843, having split from the first Reformed Dutch Church in the city. The first pastor was Rev. David D. Demarest, who served until 1852. The current church building was designed by Ludlow and Peabody and dedicated in 1928.

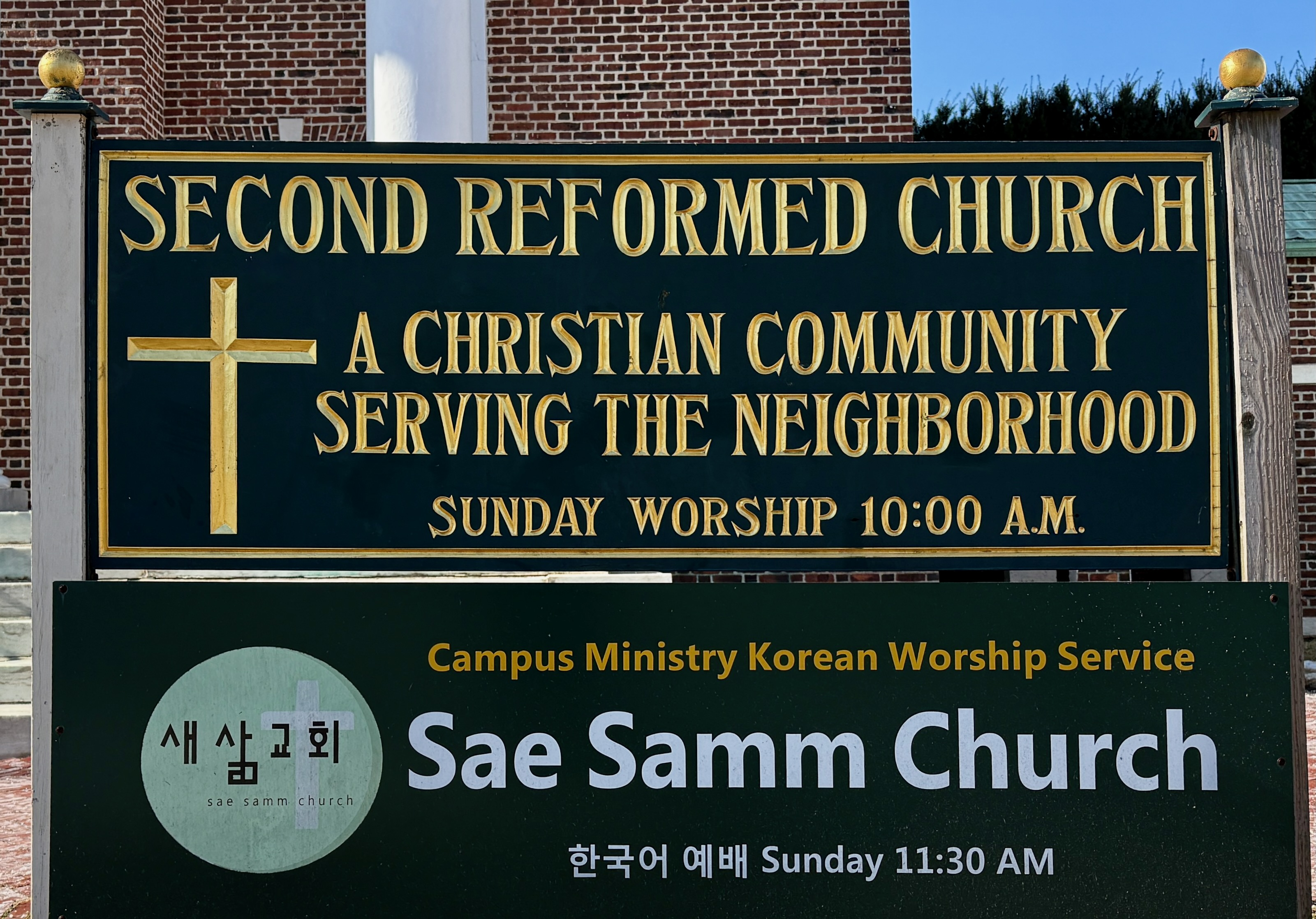
Church welcome sign
