= William Henry Steele Demarest =

American academic administrator at Rutgers University

The Reverend William Henry Steele Demarest
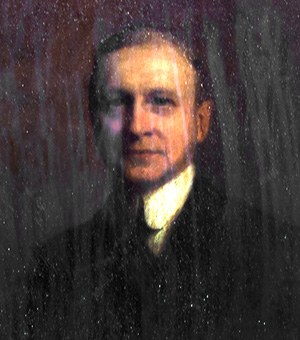

11th President of Rutgers University
- In office 1906–1924
- Preceded by: Austin Scott
- Succeeded by: John Martin Thomas

Personal details
- Born: May 12, 1863 Hudson, New York, US
- Died: June 23, 1956 (aged 93) New Brunswick, New Jersey, US
- Resting place: Elmwood Cemetery, North Brunswick, New Jersey
- Parent(s): David D. Demarest; Catharine Louisa Nevius

William Henry Steele Demarest (May 12, 1863 – June 23, 1956) was an American Reformed Protestant minister and university administrator who served as the eleventh president of Rutgers College from 1906 until 1924.

== Early life, family, and education ==
William Henry Steele Demarest was born on May 12, 1863 in Hudson, New York. His father, David D. Demarest, was a Protestant Reformed minister who served as the first professor of pastoral theology and sacred rhetoric at the New Brunswick Theological Seminary, beginning in 1865 and continuing for thirty years. His mother, Catharine Louisa (née Nevius) Demarest, was descended from a long line of eminent New Jersey citizens, including her father James S. Nevius, who served on the Supreme Court of New Jersey. Both the Demarest and Nevius families had a long association with Rutgers College, with members serving as trustees of the college as early as the 18th century.

Demarest was raised in New Brunswick and graduated from Rutgers Grammar School in 1879. He attended Rutgers and graduated with first honors in 1883.

== Career ==
Following his graduation, Demarest taught at Rutgers Grammar School from 1883 to 1886. In 1888, he graduated from New Brunswick Theological Seminary, where his father taught, and was ordained to the ministry of the Reformed Church in America. He was pastor of the Reformed Church in Walden, New York from 1888 to 1897 and in Catskill, New York from 1897 to 1901.

In 1901, the General Synod of the Church appointed Demarest as professor of ecclesiastical history and church government at New Brunswick Theological Seminary, replacing retiring professor Samuel Merrill Woodbridge. He remained professor for five years, serving as acting president of Rutgers College for his final year following the resignation of Austin Scott.

=== President of Rutgers College ===
On February 8, 1906, Demarest was formally elected president of Rutgers College by a vote of the trustees (including his father), and he was inaugurated in June.

During his tenure, the state established the New Jersey College for Women in 1918 with aid from private donors. New facilities were constructed for instruction in engineering, chemistry, entomology, and ceramics. Dormitories were built to accommodate increased enrollment.

Demarest resigned as president in 1924 and served for ten years as president of New Brunswick Theological Seminary, remaining active in the affairs of the university. In 1924, he published History of Rutgers College.

== Personal life and death ==
Demarest was a member of the University Club of New York, the Huguenot Society of America, the Holland Society of New York, the Japan Society, and Delta Phi.

Demarest died on June 23, 1956 in New Brunswick and was buried at Elmwood Cemetery.

=== Legacy ===
- Demarest Hall at Rutgers University is named in his honor.
- Demarest House was his home from 1906 until 1956.
