= New Brunswick Theological Seminary =

Reformed Church seminary in New Brunswick, US

- Type: Private
- Established: 1784; 242 years ago
- Affiliations: Reformed Church in America (Calvinism)
- President: Micah McCreary
- Students: 170 (2023)
- Location: New Brunswick, New Jersey, United States; 40°30′05″N 74°26′58″W
- Campus: Urban, 3 acres (1.2 ha)
- Website: www.nbts.edu

New Brunswick Theological Seminary is a seminary of the Reformed Church in America (RCA), a mainline Protestant denomination in Canada and the United States that follows the theological tradition and Christian practice of John Calvin. (Note: Before 1819, RCA was the North American branch of the Dutch Reformed Church.) It was founded in 1784 and is one of the oldest seminaries in the United States. First established in New York City under the leadership of John Henry Livingston, who instructed aspiring ministers in his home, in 1810 the seminary established its presence in New Brunswick, New Jersey, where its main campus is now located. Although a separate institution, the seminary's early development in New Brunswick was closely connected with that of Rutgers University (formerly Queen's College and Rutgers College) before establishing its own campus in the city in 1856.

New Brunswick Theological Seminary offers professional and graduate degree programs (Masters and Doctoral) to candidates for ministry and to those pursuing careers in academia or non-theological fields. It also offers certificates and training programs to lay church leaders seeking advanced courses in Theological Studies or Church Leadership. While rooted in the Reformed faith, New Brunswick Theological Seminary is dedicated to providing a comprehensive Christian education as "an inter-cultural, ecumenical school of Christian faith, learning, and scholarship committed to its metro-urban and global contexts". As of the fall semester of 2012, the seminary enrolled 197 students.

== History ==
=== Establishment and early history (1784–1810) ===
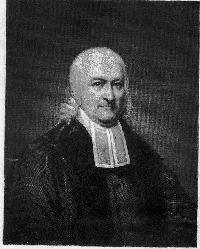
Beginning in 1784, John Henry Livingston (1746–1825) (pictured) initially offered theological instruction to students at his home.

The Dutch Reformed Synod of New York recognized that there was a shortage of adequately trained ministers to supply the church's congregations in the British American colonies. Young men had to journey to the Netherlands to pursue several years of theological studies at a Dutch university. Church leaders sought to obtain the right to examine and ordain ministers in the colonies (later in the United States), and to operate a school to train them. In 1766, several clergymen secured a charter from New Jersey's Royal Governor William Franklin for the creation of Queen's College, now Rutgers University, in New Brunswick, New Jersey "for the education of youth in the learned languages, liberal and useful arts and sciences, and especially in divinity; preparing them for the ministry and other good offices."

However, in these early years, the trustees of Queen's College and the Synod of New York disagreed on the purpose of the new institution. With uncertainty about the college's financial stability, the Synod desired to directly oversee the theological training of their ministerial candidates. However, the question of whether to open a seminary was delayed because of the ongoing hostilities of the American Revolution. After the war concluded, the Synod decided in 1784 that it was necessary to support the study of theology and recommenced the effort to establish a seminary. John Henry Livingston, a graduate of both Yale College (1762) in Connecticut and the University of Utrecht (1770) in the Netherlands, was appointed to be the Synod’s Professor of Sacred Theology and to organize theological education at Queen's College. However, Queen's College did not provide Livingston a salary, compelling him to lecture on fees paid by the students directly. Livingston remained in New York overseeing a parish and instructing theology students through lectures given in his home.

In 1792, the Synod became aware that many students were prevented from pursuing their studies in the "commercial emporium of New York" because of the high cost of living and a lack of sufficient funds. To address this difficulty, the Synod decided to locate the seminary outside of the city. However, as Queen's College had severe financial difficulties and was forced to close by 1795, New Brunswick was not considered a viable option. In 1796, Livingston was directed by the Synod to relocate his theological classes to a small school in Flatbush (now in Queens, New York) where it remained for the next 14 years.

=== A seminary in New Brunswick (1810–1856) ===
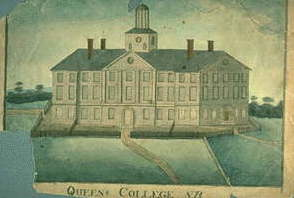
In the early 19th century, Old Queens (built 1809–1823) housed three institutions: the seminary, Rutgers College, and the college's grammar school.

After being closed for twelve years, Ira Condict and other church leaders began an effort in 1807 to revive Queen's College. Condict, the college's third president, and the college's trustees agreed to coordinate with the Synod on theological education, to hire professors, and establish a library. In 1810, Condict declined the post of president of Queen's College in a full capacity (he had been serving in a pro tempore capacity since 1795), and the trustees of the college offered the post to Livingston who accepted. The seminary was relocated to New Brunswick. The college closed again in 1816, but the trustees permitted the theological seminary to remain on the Queen's College campus and expressed hope that the college would be revived. At this time, Elias van Bunschooten, a Princeton-trained minister residing in Sussex County, New Jersey, established funded a trust for assisting indigent young men in pursuing their studies preparing for ministry.

In 1823, the Synod paid a significant portion of Queen's College's debts in order to place the institution on a secure financial footing and enable it to reopen. With the second reopening, the Synod provided clergymen to serve at the college as theology professors. Livingston had dedicated several years to raising money for the effort but died shortly before Queen's College reopened in 1825. Philip Milledoler, a Reformed clergyman from New York City, was appointed to fill the vacancy created by Livingston's death. Milledoler persuaded one of his parishioners, Colonel Henry Rutgers, to support the college. The trustees subsequently renamed it Rutgers College in his honour. At first, the Synod exercised oversight over the operations of the college, but by 1840 directed its attentions solely to the operation of the seminary. During this period Rutgers College, the college's grammar school (now Rutgers Preparatory School), and the seminary shared one building, known as Old Queens (built 1809–1823) until the two schools separated operations entirely in 1856.

According to Bruggink and Baker, in 1792 (seven years after Livingston began to teach in his home), there were 116 Reformed churches served by 40 ministers. In 1830, twenty years after starting instruction in New Brunswick and organizing the seminary, there were 159 ministers serving 194 churches.

=== Campus on "Holy Hill" (1856–2012) ===
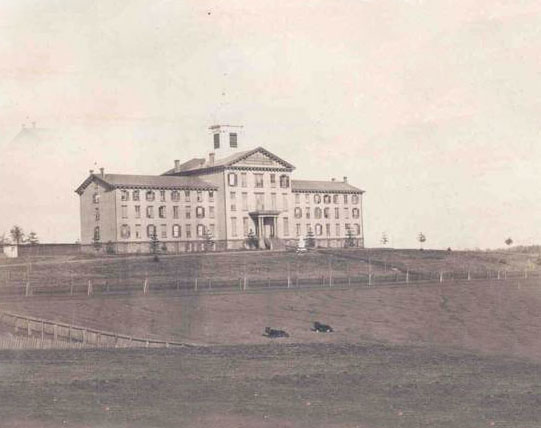
Hertzog Hall (1856) was built when both the seminary and Rutgers College became too large to be accommodated in Old Queens.

In the 1850s, the student bodies of Rutgers College and the Seminary began to expand, overcrowding the space provided at the Queens Campus. The seminary professors realized that students renting rooms at boarding houses in the city were paying more for their housing than students at other seminaries—over double the costs of housing at New York City's Union Theological Seminary or at nearby Princeton Theological Seminary. The professors surmised that it would be cheaper to build a seminary building that provided both student housing and instruction space.

When the seminary's leaders proposed the idea, the Synod of New York removed financial support from both Rutgers and the seminary. Colonel James Nielson, David Bishop, and Charles Dayton—prominent citizens in New Brunswick—donated plots of land totaling almost 8 acres (3.2 ha) consisting of part of a hill extending from George Street to College Avenue. At the same time, Ann Hertzog of Philadelphia donated $30,000 for the construction of a building to be named "Peter Hertzog Theological Hall" in memory of her husband. Hertzog Hall (built 1855–1856) became a dominant feature on the hill, which became known locally as "Holy Hill". In November 1776, during the American Revolution, the hill was the site of a British artillery redoubt during the occupation of New Brunswick.

In 1865, a fourth professor position, the Professorship of Pastoral Theology and Sacred Rhetoric, was established at the seminary. David D. Demarest was the first elected to that professorship and was inaugurated on 19 September 1865, at the First Reformed Church of New Brunswick.

Throughout the nineteenth century, the institution became known because of the efforts of missionaries serving throughout the world. In the 1870s, the campus was expanded with the construction of two buildings—one housing a gymnasium and additional lecture space; the second, a library. The seminary desired to build a library first, citing the need to house its expanding collection of books. However, local businessman and seminary benefactor James Suydam donated funds to build the gymnasium, to be named Suydam Hall, because he was concerned with student health. Suydam Hall was built in 1873 and was designed by architect Henry Janeway Hardenbergh. Hardenbergh had finished completing the design for Kirkpatrick Chapel and Geology Hall on the Rutgers campus and later would become known for buildings in New York City, including the Plaza Hotel and Dakota Apartments. After receiving a donation from Gardner A. Sage earmarked for the construction of a library, the trustees commissioned Hardenbergh's former teacher, German-American architect Detlef Lienau, to design it. The Sage Library was completed in 1875. Lienau designed the library to complement Hardenbergh's (style) design for Suydam Hall. In the 1960s, Suydam Hall and Hertzog Hall were deemed to be inadequate for the administrative and instructional needs of the seminary. The trustees voted in 1966 to demolish both buildings and replace it with a modern one-story all-purpose building, Zwemer Hall, containing the seminary's chapel, faculty offices, and classroom facilities.

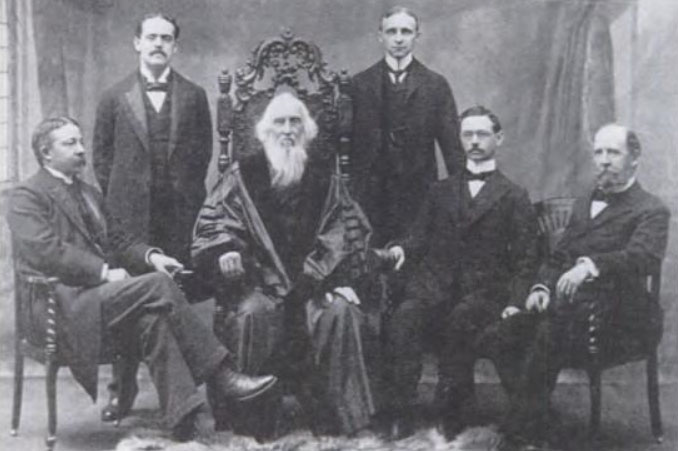
The seminary's faculty in 1904, included (left to right) John Preston Searle, John Howard Raven, Samuel Merrill Woodbridge, William Henry Steele Demarest, John Hamilton Gillespie, and Ferdinand Schureman Schenck.

In the late 1970s, during the tenure of seminary president Howard Hageman, the seminary revised its academic programs to focus on serving the needs of second career and bi-vocational students. This was intended to make theological education more accessible as the seminary transitioned during the 1980s to 2010s from "a predominantly residential school to one that is more than 90 percent commuter based." This transition meant that the seminary would serve an increasing number of second-career pastors who would study part-time. Another result of this transition was that the seminary's student body became the "most richly diverse" seminary in North America.

Today, the seminary focuses on providing a comprehensive Christian education as "an inter-cultural, ecumenical school of Christian faith, learning, and scholarship committed to its metro-urban and global contexts" and preparing its graduates to "inspire missions in a post-colonial world where the gospel is taking deep root, especially in urban areas of Africa, Asia, and Central and South America." The seminary seeks to achieve this mission by expanding through distance-learning technology and online classes to reach new constituencies. As of the fall semester of 2012, the seminary enrolled 197 students.

=== College Avenue redevelopment (2012–2014) ===
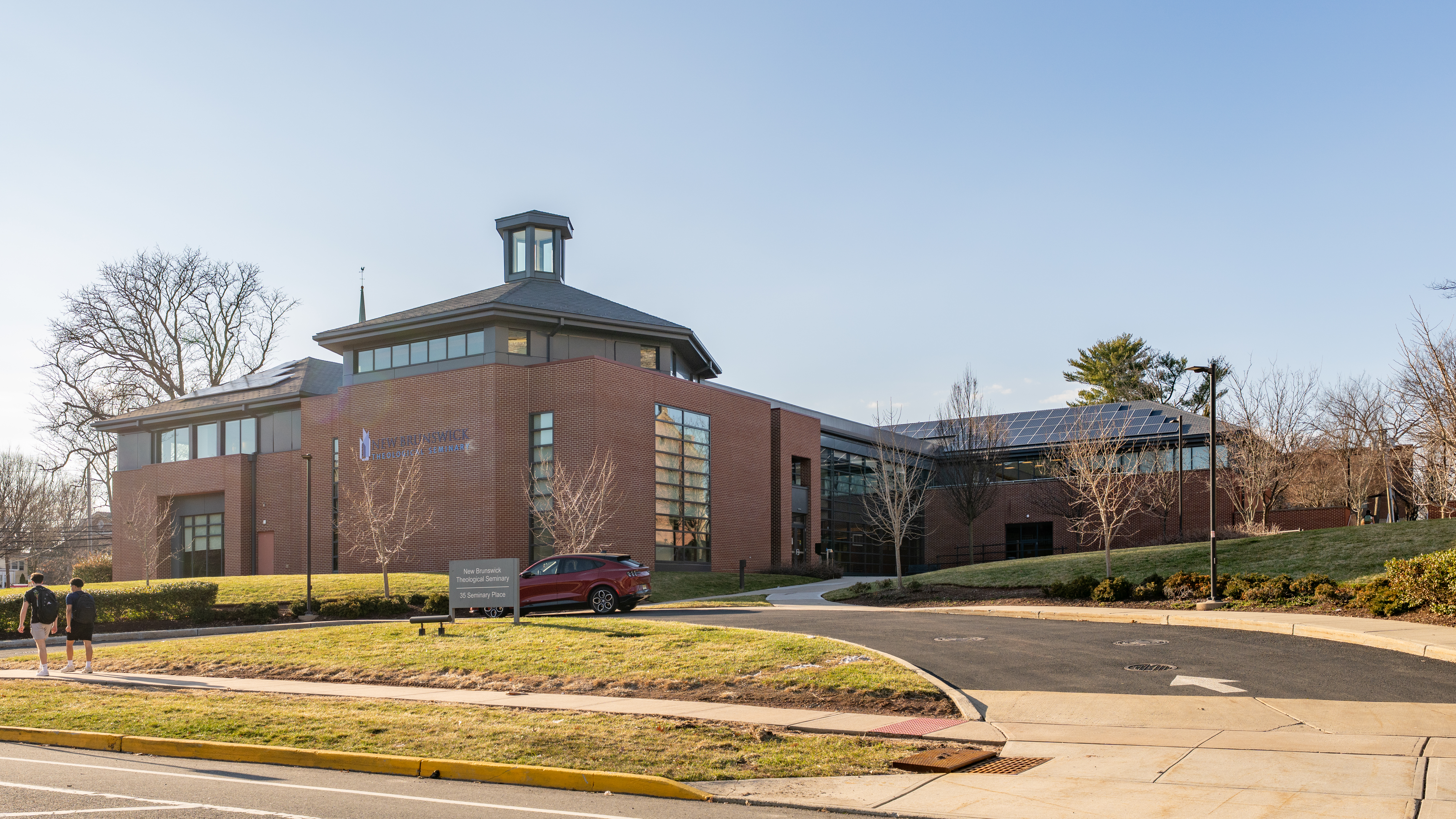
The seminary's new building, completed in 2014

New Brunswick Theological Seminary partnered with Rutgers University and the New Brunswick Development Corporation (DEVCO) on a $300 million project to redevelop the seminary's campus and a portion of the Rutger's College Avenue Campus in New Brunswick. Citing declining enrollment and financial constraints, and recognizing the maintenance needs of an aging campus including empty and unused on-campus student housing (as their student body transitioned to commuter students), the seminary sold a 5-acre (2.0 ha) portion of their 8-acre (3.2 ha) campus to Rutgers. On 20 June 2012, the outgoing president of Rutgers University, Richard L. McCormick announced that Rutgers would "integrate five acres (20,000 m²) along George Street between Seminary Place and Bishop Place into the College Avenue Campus" to build a 500-student Honors College, a dining facility, and a major academic building featuring lecture halls and departmental offices. The seminary's Board of Trustees approved this plan and the sale on 20 May 2013.

The seminary reconstructed its New Brunswick campus on 3 acres (1.2 ha) at the corner of Seminary Place and College Avenue, with a 30,000-square-foot (2,800 m^{2}) central building featuring "a chapel, classrooms, offices, conference facilities and space for commuting students as well as a 100-car parking lot" while preserving the Gardner A. Sage Library. The seminary's new campus is described as being "technologically smart and environmentally green." The seminary relocated to its new facilities in July 2014.

== Academics ==
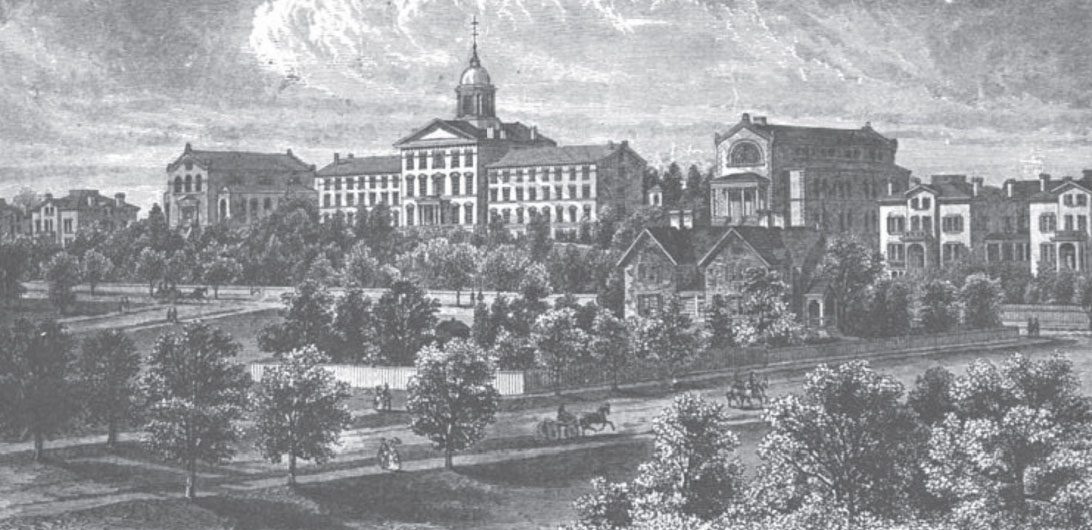
An 1880 print of the seminary campus, depicting the Sage Library (left center), Hertzog Hall (center), and Suydam Hall (right center)

New Brunswick Theological Seminary is accredited by the Commission on Accrediting of the Association of Theological Schools in the United States and Canada and the Middle States Commission on Higher Education. The seminary offers admission to students after the review of a submitted application accompanied by college transcripts and letters of recommendation. It offers courses and programs leading to four degrees: the Master of Divinity (M.Div.), Master of Arts (M.A.), Master of Arts Theological Studies, and Doctor of Ministry (D.Min.) degree; as well as certificates and training programs for lay church leaders seeking advanced courses in Theology, Bible studies, Church History, and Servant Leadership. Students are able to register in classes or complete joint degree programs with Rutgers University, Princeton Theological Seminary (Presbyterian), Western Theological Seminary (Reformed), and the Wesley Theological Seminary (Methodist).

== Gardner A. Sage Library ==
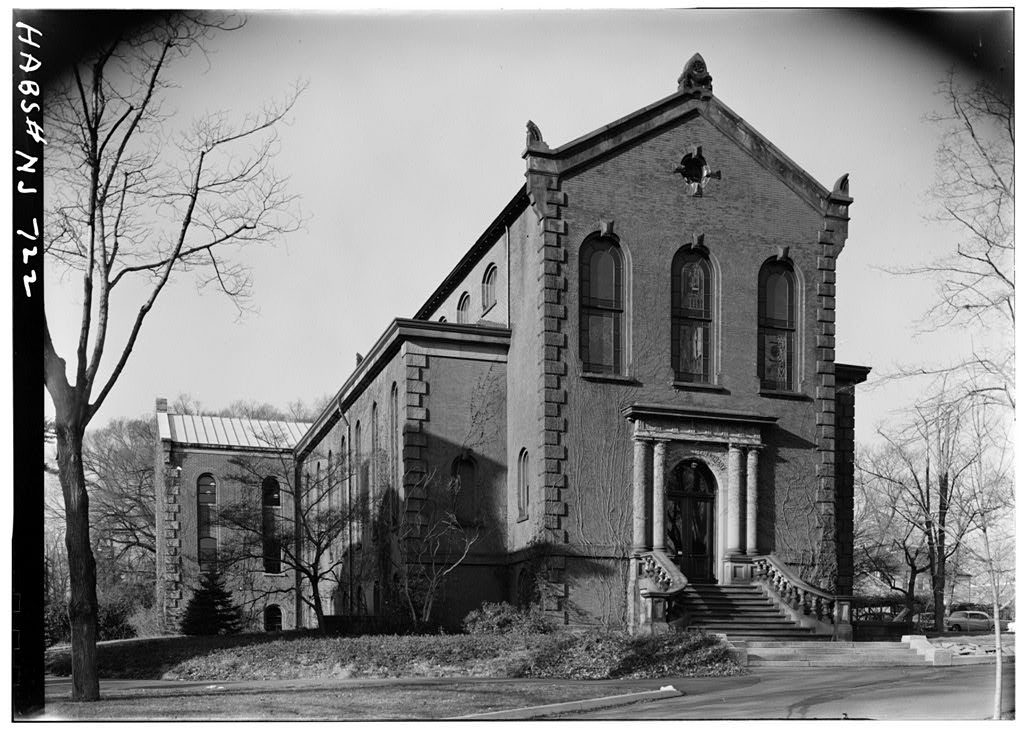
The seminary's library, the Gardner A. Sage Library (built 1873–1875) combines Romanesque and Victorian architecture.

The Gardner A. Sage Library was built in 1873–1875 and was designed by nineteenth century German-American architect Detlef Lienau. Lienau combined the elements of a Romanesque fourth century basilica and a "Victorian bookhall" to create a space conducive to "the contemplation of God." According to the seminary, the Sage Library's collection contains more than 150,000 books and 10,000 bound periodicals, spanning the topics of biblical studies, theology, Reformed Church studies, general church history and denominational history. The collection includes many rare manuscripts and printed books dating as early as the fifteenth century. The library maintains subscriptions for more than 300 periodicals. It is expanding its collection with the acquisition of books and materials on urban ministry and the religious experience of African-American and Asian immigrant communities. The library houses the official archives of the Reformed Church in America and contains comprehensive resources regarding Dutch history, culture, and Dutch Colonial Studies. The seminary's collection is augmented by reciprocal borrowing rights with the Rutgers University library system (over 10.5 million holdings) and direct affiliations with the libraries at thirty other theological schools.

== Administration and organization ==
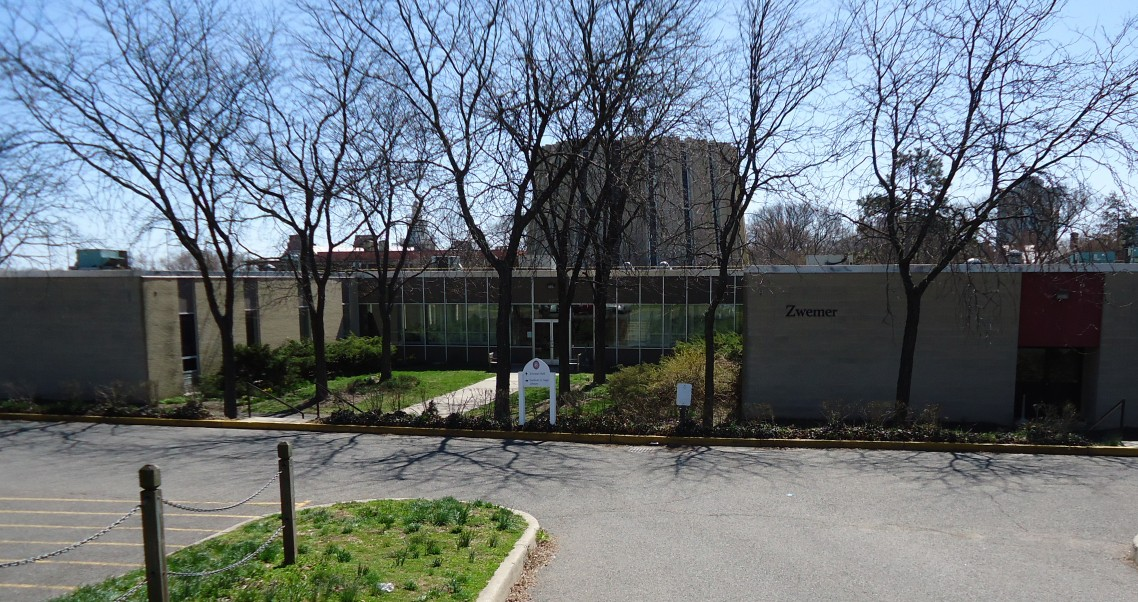
The seminary's Zwemer Hall seen from the west. To make way for campus redevelopment, Zwemer Hall was demolished in August 2014.

Affiliated with the Reformed Church in America (RCA) are two seminaries in the United States—New Brunswick Theological Seminary and the Western Theological Seminary founded in 1866 in Holland, Michigan. New Brunswick Theological Seminary, established in 1784, offers classes on two campuses. The seminary's campus in New Brunswick, built in 1856, is at the corner of College Avenue and Seminary Place.

According to the seminary's by-laws, the RCA's General Synod entrusts the management of the seminary to a board of trustees empowered to exercise control of institution's finances, securities, and property for the purpose of participating "in God’s own laboring to fulfill God’s reign on earth". The board consists of twelve to twenty-four trustees, serving for three-year terms, who are required to be "confessing Christians who acknowledge a commitment to the authority of the Bible over all matters of faith and practice, the sovereignty of God, and the Lordship of Jesus Christ over all of life". A majority of the board's members must be RCA members and each of the church's regional synods are represented by one member. The president and the General Secretary of the RCA's General Synod serve as ex officio members of the board without a vote. The by-laws further empower the seminary's trustees to provide it "with such property and buildings; faculty, administration, and staff; library and information resources; equipment and supplies as are necessary for the effective accomplishment of the Seminary's purpose". The board of trustees selects the seminary's president, who is elected for a five-year term and can be reelected to successive terms by the board. The president can be removed by a two-thirds vote of the trustees.

The president of the New Brunswick Theological Seminary is Micah McCreary who joined NBTS on 15 July 2017. He succeeded Gregg A. Mast, a clergyman who had served congregations in New Jersey, New York, and Johannesburg, South Africa, and held leadership positions within the Reformed Church of America. Mast was appointed by the trustees as the seminary's 14th president in 2006, succeeding Norman J. Kansfield.

== Notable people ==
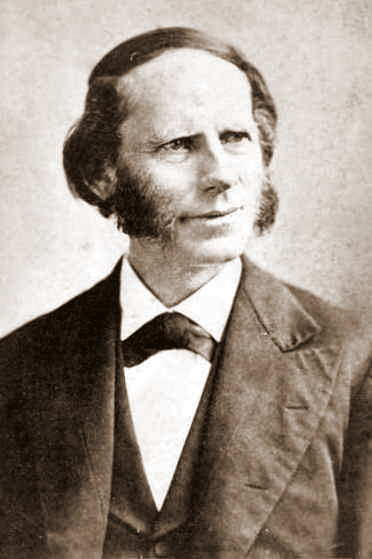
Thomas DeWitt Talmage graduated from the seminary in 1856 and became a popular nineteenth century Presbyterian minister.

The New Brunswick Theological Seminary's bylaws establish its mission "to educate persons and strengthen communities for transformational, public ministries in church and society." In its 230 year history, the seminary's faculty and alumni have taken leading roles in the ministry and missions of the Reformed Church and other Christian denominations, in academia, and in the professional world.

Because of the work and reputation of alumni who became prominent missionaries, the seminary became well known in the nineteenth century. David Abeel (B.D. 1826), served as a missionary throughout the world, including in Indonesia, Southeast Asia and China. Several members of the Scudder family, including Jared Waterbury Scudder (B.D. 1855), received their theological training at the seminary before serving as missionaries in India. Alumnus John Van Nest Talmage (B.D. 1845) served for over forty years in China for the American Reformed Mission. His younger brother, Thomas DeWitt Talmage (B.D. 1856) became known for his pulpit oratory, drawing large crowds to hear his sermons. Talmage's sermons were later published in 3,000 journals and said to reach 25 million readers worldwide. One of the main buildings on the seminary's campus, Zwemer Hall (built 1966, razed 2013) was named for Samuel Marinus Zwemer (M.A. 1890), a missionary in the Middle East who was nicknamed the "Apostle to Islam." Zwemer served in Basra, Bahrain, the Arabian peninsula, later in Egypt from 1891 to 1929, and believed that distributing literature was effective in spreading God's word. Horace Grant Underwood (B.D. 1884), served as a missionary in Korea, and was influential in establishing several educational institutions with the financial support of his brother, John T. Underwood, a typewriter entrepreneur and manufacturer. A financial gift in Spring 2011 to the seminary from the Luce Foundation and Korean Christians established an endowed professorship, the Underwood Chair for Global Christianity.

Many of the seminary's graduates have served as faculty and administrators at Rutgers, Western Theological Seminary, Hope College and several other institutions. Hope, an RCA-affiliated liberal arts college in Michigan founded in 1851, was founded upon a vision of becoming "a point of life for the whole Western Church, a Western New Brunswick." Two seminary graduates served as presidents of Rutgers: William Henry Steele Demarest, a clergyman and ecclesiastical history scholar, and Philip Milledoler Brett, a prominent New York City attorney (both also alumni of Rutgers College). Demarest served as the seminary's president for ten years from 1925 to 1935. Several other seminary alumni have served on the seminary's faculty and as its leaders—including its first dean and faculty president, Samuel Merrill Woodbridge (A.M. 1841), and its previous president, Gregg A. Mast (M.Div. 1976).
