= J. Todd Billings =

American Reformed theologian (born 1973)

- Born: 9 June 1973 (age 53); McPherson, Kansas
- Occupation: Theologian
- Notable work: Calvin, Participation, and the Gift: The Activity of Believers in Union With Christs; The Word of God for the People of God: An Entryway to the Theological Interpretation of Scripture; Union with Christ: Reframing Theology and Ministry for the Church
- Spouse: Rachel M. Billings
- Theological work
- Language: English
- Tradition or movement: Reformed /Presbyterian; Reformed theology
- Main interests: Systematic Theology; Reformed theology Community Organizing; Ecclesiology; Hermeneutics

J. Todd Billings (born 9 June 1973) is the Gordon H. Girod Research Professor of Reformed Theology at Western Theological Seminary in Holland, Michigan. Billings has lectured in Europe, South Africa, and the United States, and has published in a variety of journals, including Modern Theology, Harvard Theological Review, Missiology, and International Journal of Systematic Theology, as well as periodicals such as Christianity Today, The Christian Century, and Sojourners.

== Education and career ==
He graduated from Wheaton College with a B.A. in 1995, majoring in philosophy and English. In order to be a pastor, he studied in Fuller Theological Seminary, graduating with an M.Div. in 1999. He obtained a Doctor of Divinity (Th.D.) degree from Harvard University Divinity School in 2005. At Fuller Theological Seminary, he was particularly influenced by professors Miroslav Volf and John L. Thompson. Volf was his first theological mentor, and while studying under Thompson, he came to love historical theology, biblical hermeneutics, and Reformed theology. At Harvard Divinity School, he was taught by Sarah Anne Coakley, a distinguished scholar in historical and systematic theology, and received a Th.D for Calvin, Participation, and the Gift: The Activity of Believers in Union with Christ.

He is interested in Reformed theology, sacraments, salvation, and theological hermeneutics, and has been teaching Reformed Theology at Western Theological Seminary since 2005. In 2007, he became an ordained minister in the Reformed Church in America. In 2009, he and his wife served as missionaries to Ethiopia with the Reformed church.

His books have been translated into Korean in 2021. From the perspective of theology in the Institutes of the Christian Religion of John Calvin, he shows how Christian life would be realized.

He has been active in local church ministry, homeless care ministries, and community development in Uganda. He was also involved in various activities, including theological education in Ethiopia.

He is married to Rachel M. Billings, who holds a Ph.D. in Hebrew Bible/Old Testament from Harvard University.

== Books ==
- Calvin, Participation, and the Gift: The Activity of Believers in Union with Christ (Oxford, 2007)
- The Word of God for the People of God: An Entryway to the Theological Interpretation of Scripture (Eerdmans, 2010)
- Union with Christ: Reframing Theology and Ministry for the Church (Baker Academic, 2011),
- Rejoicing in Lament: Wrestling with Cancer and Life in Christ (Brazos 2015).
- Remembrance, Communion, and Hope: Rediscovering the Gospel at the Lord’s Table (Eerdmans, 2018)
- Calvin’s Theology and Its Reception: Disputes, Developments, and New Possibilities, coedited with I. John Hesselink (Westminster John Knox Press, 2012)
- The End of the Christian Life: How Embracing Our Mortality Frees Us to Truly Live (Brazos Press, 2020)
- Generously Reformed: Theology Rooted Deep and Reaching Wide co-authored with Suzanne McDonald and Alberto La Rosa Rojas (Baker Academic, 2026).

=== Translated Books ===
Chinese translated Rejoicing in Lament 喜唱哀歌

- 『슬픔 중에 기뻐하다』(복 있는 사람, 2019)
- 『칼뱅, 참여, 그리고 선물』
- 『그리스도와의 연합』(CLC)
