= Norman J. Kansfield =

American minister (1940–2024)

Norman Kansfield
- Born: March 24, 1940; East Chicago, Indiana, U.S.
- Died: January 27, 2024 (aged 83); New York City, U.S.
- Education: Hope College; Western Theological Seminary; Union Theological Seminary; University of Chicago
- Occupations: Minister, scholar
- Spouse: Mary Klein (m. 1965)
- Children: 2

Norman Jay Kansfield (March 24, 1940 – January 27, 2024) was an American minister who served as a senior scholar in residence at Drew University. He was suspended from being a minister in the Reformed Church in America and president of the New Brunswick Theological Seminary in 2005 after officiating at his daughter's same-sex marriage.

== Early life and education ==
Norman Kansfield was the son of Orval Russel Kansfield (1913–1990) and Margaret Norman (1914–1980) Kansfield. He was born on March 24, 1940, in East Chicago, Indiana, and was baptized in the Mount Greenwood Reformed Church in Chicago. He grew up within the First Reformed Church, South Holland, Illinois.

After graduating from Thornton Township High School, Kansfield continued his education at Hope College, Holland, MI (A.B., 1962), Western Theological Seminary, Holland, MI (B.D., 1965), Union Theological Seminary, New York, NY (S.T.M., 1967), and the University of Chicago (A.M., 1970; Ph.D., 1981).

== Career ==
Kansfield served the Emmanuel Reformed Church, London, Ontario, as a student pastor, in 1964. From 1965 to 1968, he was the pastor of the Second Reformed Church of Astoria (Queens, NYC). While doing graduate study in Chicago, he served the First Reformed Church of Berwyn, in an interim between pastors, and the Ivanhoe Reformed Church of Riverdale as an associate pastor (1968–1970). From 1970 to 1983, Kansfield was the Librarian and a member of the faculty in Western Theological Seminary, Holland, MI. From 1983 to 1993, he was the Director of the Ambrose Swasey Library, and Associate Professor of Church History in the Colgate Rochester Divinity School/Bexley Hall/Crozer Theological Seminary. The Ambrose Swasey Library also served the St. Bernard's Institute. In 1993, Kansfield was called to serve as President and the John Henry Livingston Professor of Theology for New Brunswick Theological Seminary. The General Synod of the Reformed Church in America twice elected him to the ecclesiastical office of Professor of Theology, in 1982 (which he resigned in 1983) and in 1993. During his presidency, through the concerted work of many persons, the student body increased by more than 50% and became much more ethnically and socially diverse; the faculty grew by two positions, and the school's endowment was doubled.

Kansfield has studied the history and theology of the Reformed Church in America and the development of Christian hymnody. He served as a member of the committee which produced the hymnal "Rejoice in the Lord", published in 1985. Kansfield also wrote a hymn, "In Every Age, God Calls and Shapes the Church," in honor of his daughter Ann's 2011 ordination.

He was dismissed from the Presidency due to officiating at Ann's 2004 marriage to her same-sex partner. Subsequent charges were brought to the General Synod of the Reformed Church in America, which put him on trial in June 2005. He was found guilty of all charges and punished by being deposed from the office of Professor of Theology and suspended from the office of Minister of Word and Sacrament.

Kansfield taught Reformed Theology in the Theological School at Drew University in Madison, NJ, and served the congregation of the Zion United Church of Christ, Stroudsburg, PA as Theologian. He was active in the founding of Room for All, an organization within the membership of the Reformed Church in America that is working for the full inclusion of GLBT persons within that denomination, and he served the Human Rights Campaign as a member of the Editorial Board of Out In Scripture. In 2011, Kansfield followed the process for restoration to the Office of Minister of Word and Sacrament in the Reformed Church; in return, the church reinstated him as a pastor.

== Personal life and death ==
Kansfield married historian Mary Klein Kansfield in 1965. They have two children: Ann is married to Jennifer Aull, who pastors with Ann in the Greenpoint Reformed Church in Brooklyn. Ann and Jennifer are the parents of two children, John and Grace. John is married to Melissa Marks; they have one son, Jackson.

Kansfield died at a hospital in New York City on January 27, 2024, from complications of pneumonia and other illnesses.

== Additional sources ==
- http://www.roomforall.com/news/the-rev-dr-norman-kansfield-is-reinstated-to-minister-of-word-and-sacrament/
- http://www.roomforall.com/news/norm-kansfield-interviewed-by-npr/
- Whatever happened to Pastor Ann?
- Norm Kansfield Interviewed by NPR ("Rev. Dr. Norman Kansfield, whose trial at the 2005 meeting of the RCA’s General Synod ultimately resulted in the founding of Room for All")
