= B. D. Dykstra =

Broer Doekele Dykstra (November 21, 1871 - March 29, 1955), usually cited as B. D. Dykstra, was a Dutch American peace activist, pastor, educator, publisher, and poet who wrote several books, served as editor of the Volksvriend Dutch-language newspaper, and was a visible member of the Reformed Church in America. Known in the RCA as "the man on the bicycle," he operated a small publishing house with his sons and traveled door-to-door to sell his books.

Dykstra was born "Broer Dijkstra" in Pingjum, Friesland in 1871, son of Doekele Dijkstra and Beitske van der Schaaf. The family emigrated to the United States in 1882. His family settled on a farm west of Sioux Center, Iowa. Dykstra attended and graduated from Northwestern Classical Academy (now Northwestern College), Hope College, and Western Theological Seminary. He also completed graduate studies at Yale University. He founded a Christian academy in Harrison, South Dakota and served as pastor of a Reformed church in Platte, South Dakota. A polyglot who spoke 14 languages, he became an avid pacifist known for his unconventional conduct and brilliant mind. He died in Orange City, Iowa, United States, in 1955 and is buried in Sioux Center, Iowa. At the time of his death, the Sioux Center News noted that as editor of the Volksvriend, he sometimes wrote in languages other than Dutch or English, "much to the confusion of his readers."

Northwestern College offers the Dykstra-Muste-Nelson Peace Scholarship in his, A.J. Muste's, and Ronald R. Nelson's honor. Several of his sons became prominent educators and theologians. D. Ivan Dykstra was a professor of philosophy at Hope College, Wesley C. Dykstra held the same position at Alma College, and Vergil Dykstra served as president of George Mason University.

== Books by Dykstra ==
- Korte Gedichten or Short Poems, 1935
- Ten Eeuwigen Vrede or For Everlasting Peace, 1937
- Washington Per Fiets or Washington by Bicycle, 1937
- Door Californië Per Fiets in 1936 or Through California by Bicycle, 1939
- Geloof en Leven or Belief and Life, 1941
- De Wet des Heeren or The Law of the Lord, 1943

== See also ==
- List of peace activists
