= First Reformed Church (Orange City, Iowa) =

First Reformed Church – Orange City, Iowa
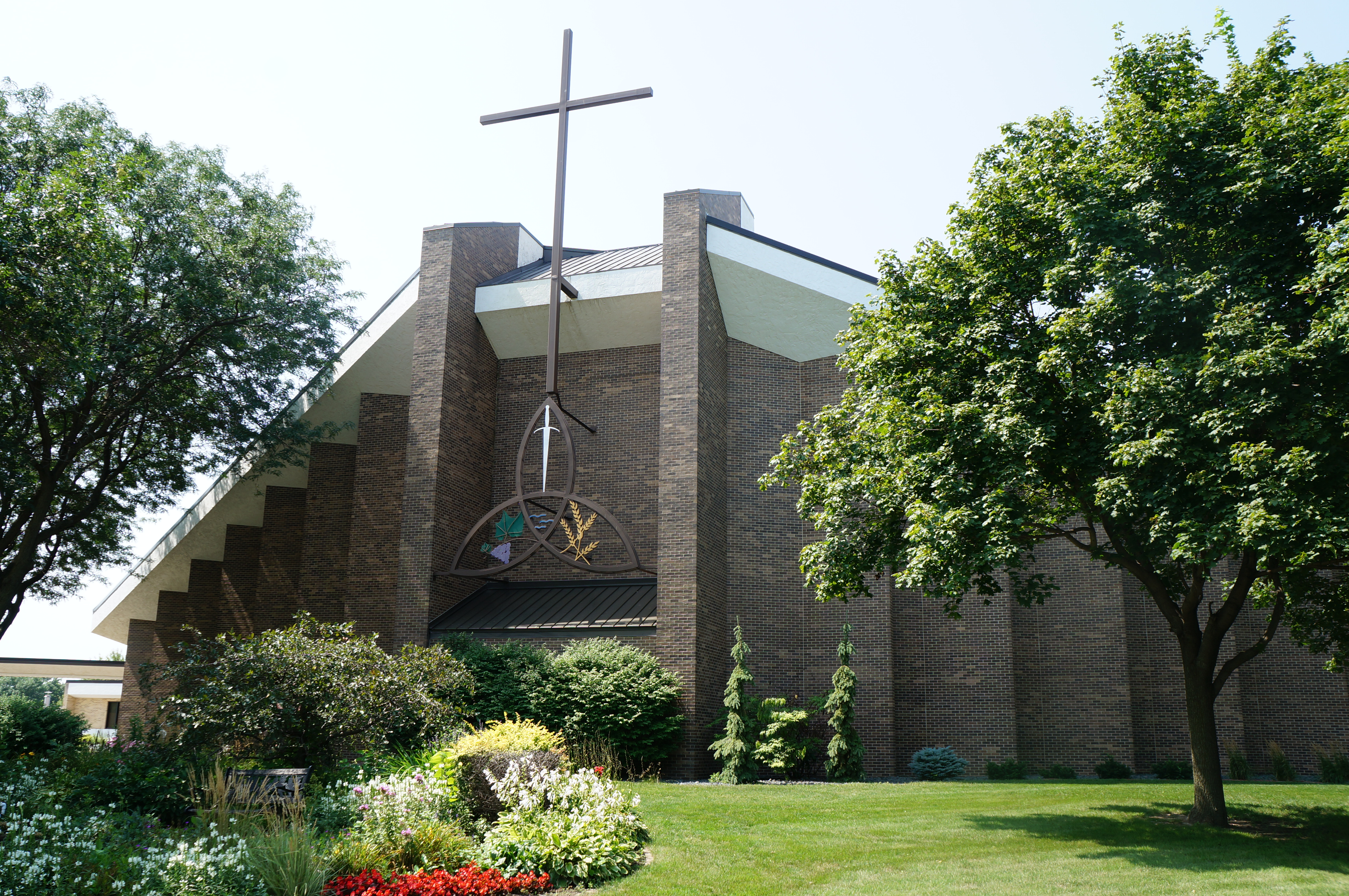
- Give Glory to God, To Know Christ and Make Christ Known
- First Reformed Church – Orange City, Iowa
- 43°00′38″N 96°03′31″W
- Location: Orange City, Iowa
- Country: United States
- Denomination: Kingdom Network
- Churchmanship: Evangelical; Reformed
- Website: frcoc.org

History
- Founded: May 6, 1871

Clergy
- Pastor(s): Rev. Timothy Breen and Rev. Mark Haverdink

First Reformed Church (Orange City), founded in 1871, is an active church in the Kingdom Network located in Orange City, Iowa.

== History ==
=== Early years ===
First Reformed Church (FRC) was organized on May 6, 1871 in order to serve the Dutch Settlers who began arriving in Orange City in 1870. As a result of population growth and the rising cost of land, a large group of Hollanders moved 300 miles northwest from Pella, IA. As people of deep and abiding religious faith, the establishment of a Christian church was one of the community's first priorities. Initial services were led by literate lay people (mostly farmers), who would read the Bible, pray, sing Psalms, and possibly read from a book of sermons. As the community of Dutch settlers continued to grow, the need for an ordained minister became readily apparent – there was no one available to perform baptisms or administer the Eucharist. After the church was officially organized, it extended a call to the Reverend Seine Bolks of Zeeland, Michigan, who became the church's first minister in April 1872.

The first few years were exceedingly hard for the new settlers. "Prairie fires, hordes of grasshoppers which stripped the fields bare, hail-storms, droughts and severe blizzards were commonplace during the first decade of the church’s existence". The Church was even forced to close for a few weeks in 1882 as a result of a smallpox epidemic. The people persevered in part because of the constant reassurance of Dominee Bolks. Through immigration, birth, and mission, the church continued to grow steadily into the 20th century.

=== Dominee Bolks - 1872–1878 ===
Reverend Seine Bolks is still known among the people as Dominee Bolks - a title of respect and the Dutch equivalent of 'Reverend Bolks'. When a call was first extended to him in the fall of 1871, he declined, but later accepted after the call was extended to him a second time. He arrived in Orange City and began his pastorate in April 1872.

As a young man, Bolks had shown promise and was hand-picked and trained by Rev. Albertus van Raalte (Dutch immigrant and founder of Holland, MI). Bolks followed Van Raalte to Michigan in 1848 where he became the first pastor of the Overisel Reformed Church. He served churches in Wisconsin and Illinois before coming to northwest Iowa.

He preached twice each Sunday in Orange City and as the community grew and spread, he would journey three to four times a week to an outlying schoolhouse to preach to those who lived far from the church. Later, when churches organized in Sioux Center and Alton, he preached to these congregations until they received their own ministers.

In addition to being a minister, Bolks was often called upon to care for the sick and injured. In the absence of a medical doctor, Bolks used his limited medical training to perform amputations and to assist midwives. Once a trained doctor arrived at the colony, Bolks refused to make any more calls.

Due to failing health, Bolks handed over his responsibilities to Rev. Buursma, though he remained active in the community until his death on June 16, 1894.

=== Rev. Ale Buursma - 1879–1889 ===
Rev. Ale Burrsma was a Frisian-born Civil War veteran and a member of the first graduating classes of Hope College and Western Theological Seminary. He was called three times before he decided to leave his church in South Holland, IL to come to Orange City. He was the first pastor at FRC to be able to preach in English, though he rarely did so. The growing 'American' population led to the formation of the English-language American Reformed Church in 1885.

Buursma cared deeply about Christian education and was given a three-month leave of absence in 1883 to fill a vacancy at the new Northwestern Classical Academy. Buursma also acted as principal for a year at the school. He served for a decade at FRC and left in 1889 to be the pastor of Fifth Reformed Church in Grand Rapids, MI.

=== Rev. Harm Vander Ploeg - 1890–1893 ===
After Rev. Buursma left, FRC was without a minister for over a year, eventually calling Harmen Vander Ploeg. His pastorate was shortened by ill health, but he was valued for his strong morals and theology as well as his concern for missions. He served the church until his death in 1893, little more than two-and-a-half years after beginning at FRC.

=== Rev. Matthew Kolyn - 1893–1898 ===
Rev. Matthew Kolyn was the first American born pastor at First Reformed. A Wisconsin native, he graduated from New Brunswick Theological Seminary in New Jersey. His pastorate showed the beginnings of the Americanization movement within the church as First Reformed established a branch of Christian Endeavor - an evangelical, interdenominational youth organization that exposed the youth, in English, to non-Reformed theology and hymnody. At the same time, the consistory insisted that Sunday school continue to use Dutch material.

Kolyn periodically suffered from ill health and after his five years in Orange City, he became a professor at Western Theological Seminary.

=== Rev. N. M. Steffens - 1898–1901 ===
Reverend Nicholas Martinus Steffens was born in Germany, educated in the Netherlands, and was a missionary to the Jewish population in Istanbul. He served congregations on the Dutch-German border and in the United States, taught at Western Theological Seminary and Dubuque Theological Seminary and was a friend and ally of the theologian-politician Abraham Kuyper. It was surprising to many that a man of his stature accepted the call to a church in a developing and isolated area, but he may have been influenced by the fact that his daughter taught at the Northwestern Classical Academy. His pastorate was short lived and after two years he accepted the call again to teach at Dubuque Seminary.

=== Rev. E. W. Stapelkamp - 1901–1907 ===
Like Kolyn, the Rev. Evert Stapelkamp was born in Wisconsin and graduated from Hope College and New Brunswick Seminary. During his time at First Reformed Church, the renting of pews was abolished. He also introduced electric lighting to the sanctuary and added concrete sidewalks. The church choir, an American innovation, was introduced and singers were instructed to sing beside the organ. He too had health problems that led him to resign.

=== Rev. John Engelsman - 1908–1925 ===
Rev. Engelsman had the longest pastorate at First Reformed Church up to that time. He preferred to preach in Dutch, but was able to preach in strongly accented English. This caused considerable tension during the World War I (his lawn was set on fire for being too 'Dutch'), when state policy called for English-only services (the Sioux County Board of Defense allowed the service to be repeated in Dutch after an English service). Rev. Engelsman took a group to Palestine in 1914, after which he presented lectures on his trip throughout the town.

=== Rev. Dr. Henry Colenbrander - 1925–1960 ===
Colenbrander was the pastor of First Reformed Church for 35 years through a myriad of transitions - in particular the transition from worshipping in Dutch to worshipping in English. He served as the president of the Board of Trustees at Northwestern Classical Academy for thirty-four years and oversaw its expansion to a junior college in 1928 and, just before his death, to a four year college. A men's residence hall on campus is named in his honor.

=== Rev. Raymond Van Heukelom - 1961–1979 ===
Under Rev. Van Heukelom, FRC recognized the need to expand its ministry and began to increase its staff and services. An associate pastor was hired to help with education in the newly expanded education wing. A second morning service was introduced to deal with the growing congregation. Two services led to a feeling of two congregations, a problem which was solved by the tearing down of the old sanctuary and building the current sanctuary in 1979 so that the entire congregation could worship together. The church's ministry continued to expand as retired RCA pastors began to assist part-time in FRC's ministry.

=== Rev. Cecil Martens - 1981–1988 ===
As the culture shifted entering the 1980s, Rev. Cecil Martens was asked to provide faithful leadership and to lend an outward focus to the church's ministry. The realization that one could no longer say that 'everyone went to church' helped shift the mission emphasis of the church from purely international missions to include local efforts as well. Rev. Martens also took great strides in reaching out to the college community and making FRC a place that the local students would want to attend.

=== Rev. Steve Vander Molen - 1989–2005 ===
Rev. Vander Molen served the church for 15 years before taking calls at Christ Memorial Church in Holland, MI. In 1996, he contributed to church's most recent history book at its 125th anniversary. In 2000, he oversaw the expansion of the office space in order to better accommodate the growing staff. Author Kevin DeYoung served as associate pastor under pastor Vander Molen, but moved on after 2 years due to DeYoung's strong commitment to Complementarianism in ministry.

=== Rev. Perry De Groot, Rev. Edward Suffern, Rev. James Daniels - 2005–2010 ===
At this time, the church moved to a tri-part staff structure. Rev. Perry De Groot was the Shepherding Pastor (2006–2010). Rev. Edward Suffern was the Preaching/Teaching Pastor (2007–2009). Rev. James Daniels was the Equipping Pastor (2005–2008).

=== Rev. Timothy Breen - 2010–present ===
In August 2010, First Reformed Church extended a call to Rev. Timothy Breen. Rev. Breen continues to serve as the Lead Pastor and lives in Orange City with his wife and two children.

In May 2011, the consistory called Rev. Mark Haverdink - a native son of FRC - to be the Pastor of Congregational Life.

== Beliefs ==
First Reformed Church is an Evangelical and Reformed congregation that is active within the Kingdom Network.

== Mission ==
=== Daughter Churches ===
Throughout its long history, First Reformed Church has birthed numerous daughter churches in northwest Iowa, including

- First Reformed Church - Sioux Center, IA (1877)
- First Reformed Church - Alton, IA (1877)
- Reformed Church of Newkirk - Newkirk, IA (1882)
- First Reformed Church - Maurice, IA (1884)
- American Reformed Church - Orange City, IA (1885)
- Reformed Church of Middleburg - Middleburg, IA (1885)
- Trinity Reformed Church - Orange City, IA (1919)

=== Northwestern College ===
In 1882, First Reformed Church established Northwestern Classical Academy (now Northwestern College) in Orange City to serve as a place to educate the young people in the community. There has been consistent support and leadership from the Church to the college community.

=== Local and international missions ===
Throughout its history, First Reformed Church has consistently supported missionaries both locally and across the world. As of 2011, over 90 sons and daughters of the congregation had become ministers or missionaries.
