= University Reformed Church (East Lansing, Michigan) =

- University Reformed Church of East Lansing, Michigan
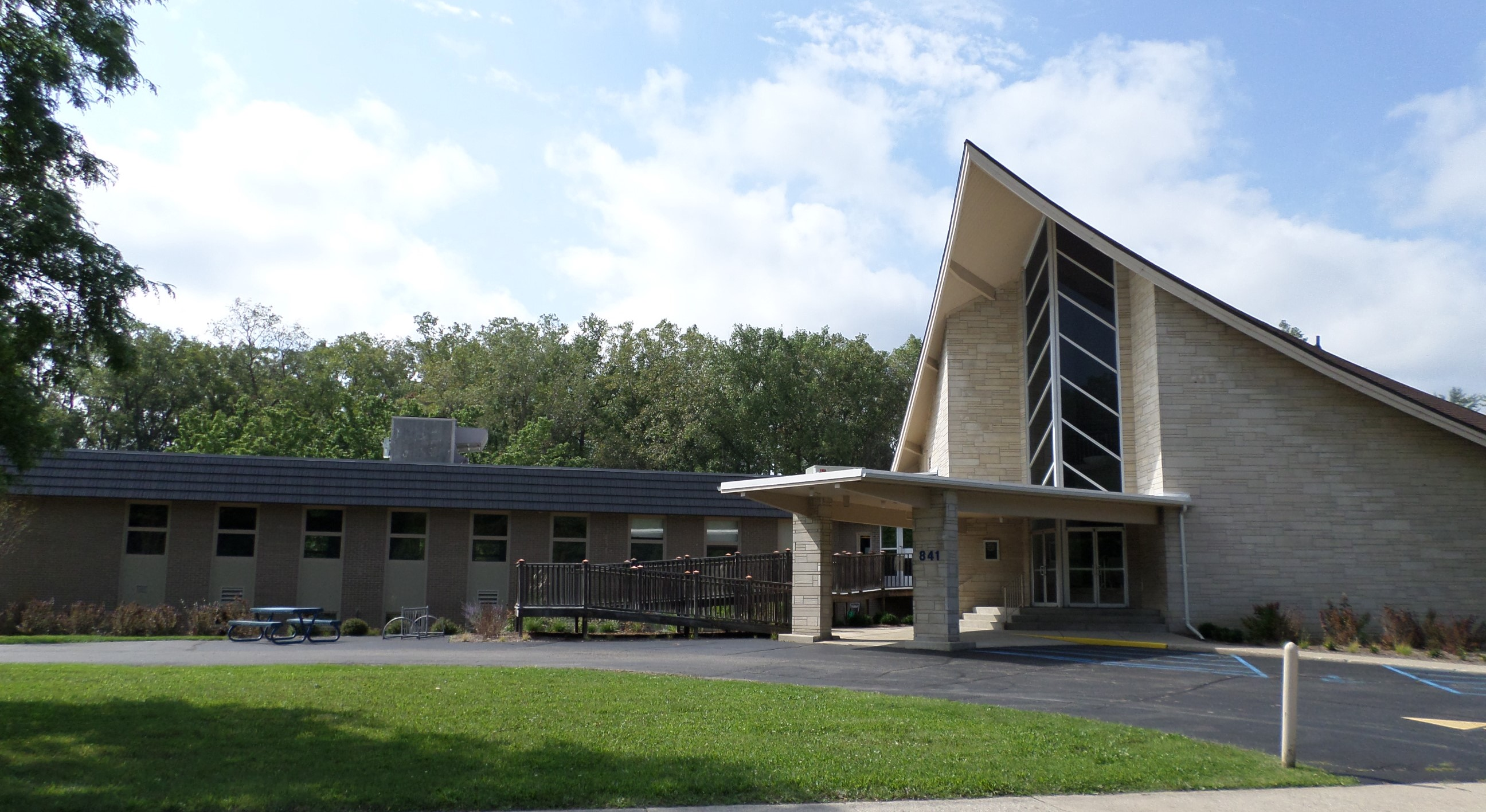
- The church in September 2015

- Location within Michigan Location within the United States
- 42°44′36.8″N 84°27′10.3″W
- Location: 841 Timberlane St, East Lansing, Michigan 48823
- Country: United States
- Denomination: Presbyterian Church in America
- Previous denomination: Reformed Church in America
- Churchmanship: Evangelical, Reformed
- Website: universityreformedchurch.org

History
- Founded: October, 1966
- Founder: Rev. Tom Stark

Architecture
- Completed: June, 1976

University Reformed Church is a Reformed Presbyterian Church in East Lansing, Michigan, founded in 1966. In March, 2015, the church shifted denominational affiliation to the Presbyterian Church in America (PCA) from the Reformed Church in America (RCA).

== History ==
The church originated out of a desire of the Synod of the Great Lakes (RCA) to initiate a ministry to the campus of Michigan State University, which grew to over 40,000 students by the end of the 1960s. Such an effort had been achieved at the University of Michigan through the creation of University Reformed Church of Ann Arbor, Michigan in 1959. Under the leadership of Rev. James Schut, the Synod purchased land on Hagadorn Road, across from the MSU campus, in 1963. The ministry itself was not started until 1966, when the Rev. Tom Stark was called as pastor. Stark was a 1962 graduate of Pittsburgh Theological Seminary, had been licensed to preach by the Chicago Presbytery of the Presbyterian Church (U.S.A.), and had worked for four years in campus ministry with Intervarsity in Chicago and Urbana, Illinois. He was ordained in September, 1966 at Immanuel Reformed Church in Lansing.

The first worship service was held in the Alumni Chapel in October 1966 and drew 35 people. For the first year, evening services were held in the MSU Union, but moved to the basement of the chapel after the ministry purchased a piano that could be left there. Support and encouragement were provided for the first year and half by a steering committee composed of the Rev. Schut, Rev. Howard Schipper of Immanuel Reformed, and Rev. Calvin Malefyt of University Reformed in Ann Arbor. Communion was served once every three months by elders from Immanuel.

The ministry was formally organized as a congregation in the spring of 1968, with between 30 and 40 members. Services continued to be held in the Alumni Chapel until the new building was finished in June, 1976. An adjacent piece of property to the north was purchased in 1981 and an expansion was added on, called Ministries House, with space for offices and meeting rooms. An additional two-story addition was built in 1999-2000 to provide more classroom space and a larger church office. Tom Stark retired in July, 2002 after a ministry of 36 years. In August, 2004, the Rev. Kevin DeYoung was called as University Reformed's second pastor. DeYoung is a prominent writer and a council member of The Gospel Coalition.

== Denomination change issues ==
The church voted to sever all relationships with RCA in November, 2014, with 91% of the communicant membership voting to change denominational affiliation to the PCA. University Reformed Church currently has 422 members and a Sunday morning attendance of around 650.

The main issues that drove the church to disaffiliate from the RCA were the removal of the conscience clause over women's ordination, increasing acceptance of homosexuality, and the adoption of the Belhar Confession. The church became a member of The Great Lakes Presbytery (PCA). University Reformed Church (URC) must pay its annual assessment for 2015 and 2016 (roughly $80,000 total) and pay an additional $200,000 so that the classis can plant another church in the area.

Other reasons cited for departing the RCA for the PCA included:

- "We have a deep desire to belong to a family of churches where who we are as a congregation fits squarely with what our denomination does and believes. We want to raise up pastors who do not fear that the ordination process is against them".
- "We want to work alongside churches that share our convictions. We want to be in a denomination that sees us as occupying center ground, not some extreme right flank".
- "The denomination (RCA) has moved away from churches like ours. We want to work alongside churches that share our convictions. In practice, the RCA is already well down this path [of endorsing homosexual activity] and that given the way our classical structure works those who stand for biblical orthodoxy can do little to stop it. We believe laboring in such a mixed denomination undermines the true nature of biblical unity, hinders our witness for Christ, and does not represent the most effective avenue for ministry for URC in the years and decades ahead."
- "URC would be able to serve with greater integrity and disciple our people (especially ministerial candidates) more effectively if we were in a denomination that shares our complementarian convictions, rather than in one that is moving full speed ahead in the other direction."
- "We (URC) are troubled by the weak form of confessional subscription in the RCA, the process for examining ministerial candidates, and our formal ecumenical ties with liberal denominations like the UCC, ELCA and PCUSA".
- "We have often heard from visitors that though they lived in Lansing for years they never thought to visit URC because it was an RCA church or because of things they had heard about liberal leanings in the RCA. How many others might be staying away because our denominational affiliation gives them the wrong idea about who we are and what we believe? We do not recommend our RCA seminaries."
- "The RCA connection inhibits interest in planting churches, the vision for training up pastors, and placement for new pastors. We also feel a measure of distance between us and most churches in the denomination".

== Recent history ==
In 2017, Rev. Kevin DeYoung accepted a call as Senior Pastor to Christ Covenant Church of Matthews, NC, and took on the position of Assistant Professor of Systematic Theology at Reformed Theological Seminary in Charlotte, NC. Following an extensive candidate search, the Reverend Jason Helopoulos was called as Senior Pastor in 2018. Helopoulos, who holds a Masters of Theology degree (ThM) from Dallas Theological Seminary, had been serving as Assistant Pastor since 2012.

== Doctrine ==
The church adheres to the historic Reformed standards:

- Apostles’ Creed
- Nicene Creed
- Athanasian Creed
- Belgic Confession
- Heidelberg Catechism
- Canons of Dort
