= Zwemer Hall, Northwestern College =

- U.S. National Register of Historic Places
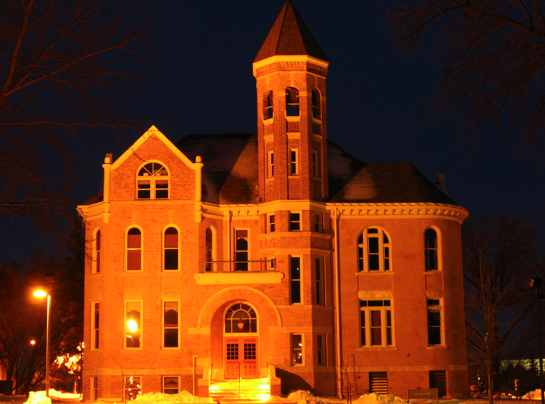

- Location within Iowa Location within the United States
- Location: 101 7th St., SW; Orange City, Iowa
- Coordinates: 42°59′53″N 96°03′30″W
- Area: less than one acre
- Built: 1894
- Architect: George Pass, Sr.
- Architectural style: Romanesque Revival
- NRHP reference No.: 75000698
- Added to NRHP: May 28, 1975

Zwemer Hall, is a historic building located on the campus of Northwestern College in Orange City, Iowa, United States. It was built in 1894 to house what was then called the Northwestern Classical Academy. Mankato architect George Pass Sr. was responsible for designing the Romanesque Revival building. It is named after the Rev. James F. Zwemer, a Reformed Church in America clergyman, professor and college administrator. The 2½-story brick structure is built on a raised limestone basement. The building measures 68 by 72 feet (21 by 22 m) and the tower on the north side rises 90 feet (27 m). While utilized for a variety of academic purposes over the years, it is now used as the college's administration building. Zwemer Hall was listed on the National Register of Historic Places in 1975, and extensively renovated in 1995.
