= First Reformed Church =

First Reformed Church or variations including "Old" or otherwise may refer to:

- First Reformed Church (Orange City, Iowa)
- First Reformed Church (Pella, Iowa), a Presbyterian historic site
- First Reformed Church, New Brunswick, New Jersey, listed on the NRHP in New Jersey
- First Reformed Church (Albany, New York), listed on the NRHP in New York
- Old First Reformed Church (Brooklyn, New York), listed on the NRHP in New York
- First Reformed Church (New York, New York), listed on the NRHP in New York
- First Reformed Church (Piermont, New York), listed on the NRHP in New York
- First Reformed Church of Schenectady, Schenectady, New York
- First Reformed Church (Lexington, North Carolina), listed on the NRHP in North Carolina
- Old First Reformed Church (Philadelphia, Pennsylvania), a Presbyterian historic site
