= James Bultman =

American football coach

James E. Bultman is an American football coach who served as the president of Hope College in Holland, Michigan from 14 years, 1999–2013. He retired on July 1, 2013. Bultman had served as the president of Northwestern College in Orange City, Iowa since 1985. Northwestern, like Hope, is one of the three colleges in America with ties to the Reformed Church in America.

Bultman graduated from Hope with a major in chemistry in 1963. He later earned his master's degree and doctorate in education from Western Michigan University. He joined the Hope faculty in 1968, and was head baseball coach from 1971 to 1985, and an assistant football coach from 1970 to 1985. Bultman also earned an honorary degree from Keiwa College in Shibata City, Japan.

In 2001, Bultman was presented with a distinguished alumni award from the Western Michigan University Alumni Association.
