= Kevin DeYoung =

American pastor, historian and author

The Reverend Kevin DeYoung
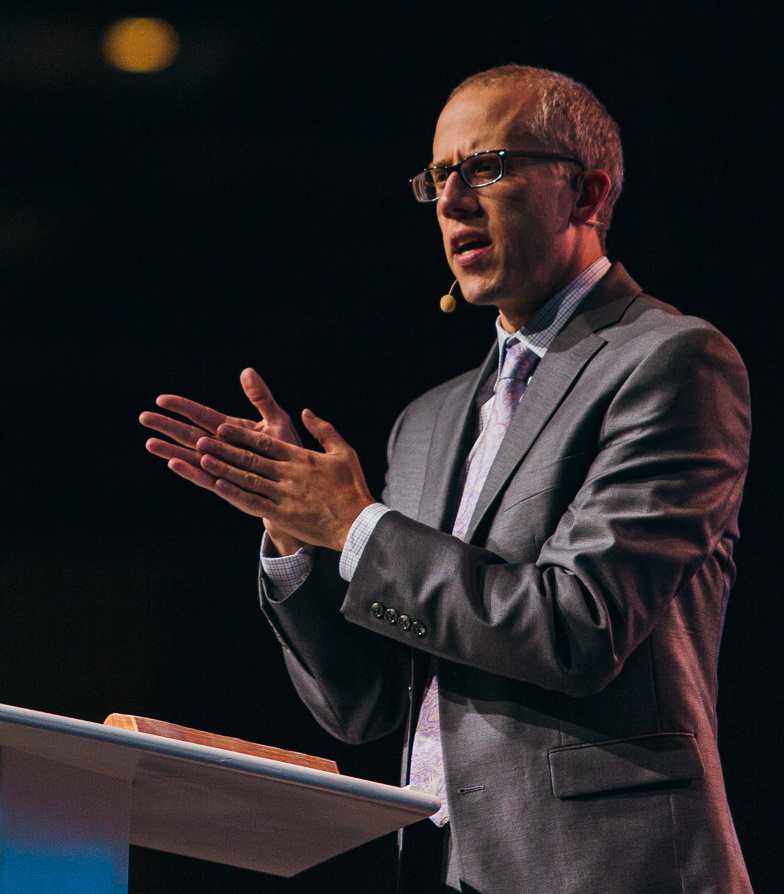
- Born: Kevin Lee DeYoung; June 23, 1977 (age 49); South Holland, Illinois, U.S.
- Spouse: Trisha
- Children: 9

Academic background
- Education: B.A. Hope College, 1999; M.Div. Gordon-Conwell Theological Seminary, 2002; Ph.D. University of Leicester, 2019
- Thesis: John Witherspoon and “The Fundamental Doctrines of the Gospel”: The Scottish Career of an American Founding Father. (2019)
- Doctoral advisor: John Coffey (historian)

Academic work
- School or tradition: Reformed (Presbyterianism)
- Institutions: Reformed Theological Seminary

Ecclesiastical career
- Church: RCA (2002-2015); PCA (2015-present)
- Ordained: 2002
- Congregations: Christ Covenant Church (Matthews, North Carolina)
- Website: clearlyreformed.org

Kevin Lee DeYoung (born June 23, 1977) is an American Reformed theologian, historian, and pastor. He is currently the senior pastor at Christ Covenant Church in Matthews, North Carolina. The church he previously pastored, University Reformed Church (East Lansing, Michigan), moved to the Presbyterian Church in America in March 2015 after having been a member of the Reformed Church in America.

Presently, DeYoung is a member of the Gospel Coalition's council. He also contributes articles to various other evangelical organizations, such as World, 9Marks, and Desiring God.

== Early life ==
DeYoung was born in South Holland, Illinois, and largely grew up in Jenison, Michigan, where his parents Lee and Sheri DeYoung worked for Words of Hope, an international media ministry based in Grand Rapids, Michigan. Both of his grandfathers were from Dutch Reformed backgrounds.

== Education ==
DeYoung graduated from Hope College in Michigan in 1999 and then received his M.Div. from Gordon-Conwell Theological Seminary in Massachusetts in 2002.

He completed a Ph.D. in early modern history focusing on the theology of John Witherspoon at the University of Leicester (John Coffey served as his adviser), successfully defending his Ph.D. thesis on January 10, 2019.

== Career ==
DeYoung first served as a pastor at First Reformed Church in Orange City, Iowa. From August 2004 to June 2017, he served as senior pastor at University Reformed Church in East Lansing, Michigan, near Michigan State University.

DeYoung has authored or co-authored many books and articles; his book Why We're Not Emergent (co-authored with Ted Kluck) won the 2009 Christianity Today book award. His book Why We Love the Church (also co-authored with Ted Kluck) won the 2010 Christianity Today Book Award and Leadership Journal Golden Canon Book Award. Crazy Busy: A (Mercifully) Short Book about a (Really) Big Problem was awarded the 2014 Christian Book of the Year by the Evangelical Christian Publishers Association (ECPA). DeYoung is a member of the Gospel Coalition Council with John Piper and others.

He has been a keynote speaker at many conferences including Together for the Gospel, the Gospel Coalition, and the Shepherd's Conference.

DeYoung joined the faculty at Reformed Theological Seminary Charlotte in 2017 as an assistant professor. On June 1, 2021, he was promoted to associate professor of Systematic Theology.

On June 25, 2025, DeYoung was elected Moderator of the 52nd General Assembly of the Presbyterian Church in America.

== Written works ==
- Freedom and Boundaries: A Pastoral Primer on the Role of Women in the Church (2006)
- Why We're Not Emergent: By Two Guys Who Should Be, co-authored with Ted Kluck (2008)
- Why We Love the Church: In Praise of Institutions and Organized Religion, co-authored with Ted Kluck (2009)
- Just Do Something: A Liberating Approach to Finding God's Will (2009)
- The Good News We Almost Forgot: Rediscovering the Gospel in a 16th Century Catechism (2010)
- Why Our Church Switched to the ESV (2011), 31-page booklet
- What Is the Mission of the Church?: Making Sense of Social Justice, Shalom, and the Great Commission, co-authored with Greg Gilbert (2011)
- Don't Call It a Comeback: The Old Faith for a New Day (The Gospel Coalition) (2011)
- The Holy Spirit (The Gospel Coalition Booklets) (2011)
- The Hole in Our Holiness: Filling the Gap between Gospel Passion and the Pursuit of Godliness (2012)
- The Gospel as Center: Renewing Our Faith and Reforming Our Ministry Practices (The Gospel Coalition) (2012)
- Crazy Busy: A (Mercifully) Short Book about a (Really) Big Problem (2013)
- Acting the Miracle: God's Work and Ours in the Mystery of Sanctification (contributed) (2013)
- Taking God At His Word: Why the Bible Is Knowable, Necessary, and Enough, and What That Means for You and Me (April 2014)
- What Does the Bible Really Teach about Homosexuality? (April 2015)
- The Biggest Story: How the Snake Crusher Brings Us Back to the Garden, illustrated by Don Clark (August 2015)
- The Art of Turning: From Sin to Christ for a Joyfully Clear Conscience (June 2017)
- The Biggest Story ABC, illustrated by Don Clark (August 2017)
- Acts: A Visual Guide, illustrated by Chris Ranson (May 2018)
- The Ten Commandments: What They Mean, Why They Matter, and Why We Should Obey Them (Foundational Tools for Our Faith) (October 2018)
- Grace Defined and Defended: What a 400-Year-Old Confession Teaches Us about Sin, Salvation, and the Sovereignty of God (April, 2019)
- The Religious Formation of John Witherspoon: Calvinism, Evangelicalism, and the Scottish Enlightenment (February, 2020)
- Men and Women in the Church: A Short, Biblical, Practical Introduction (April, 2021)
- The Biggest Story Bible Storybook, illustrated by Don Clark (March, 2022)
- The Lord's Prayer: Learning from Jesus on What, Why, and How to Pray, (May, 2022)
- Justification and Regeneration: Practical Writings on Saving Faith, notes on the original John Witherspoon-authored text (May, 2022)
- Do Not Be True to Yourself: Countercultural Advice for the Rest of Your Life (May, 2023)
- Impossible Christianity: Why Following Jesus Does Not Mean You Have to Change the World, Be an Expert in Everything, Accept Spiritual Failure, and Feel Miserable Pretty Much All the Time (August, 2023)
- The (Not-So-Secret) Secret to Reaching the Next Generation (April, 2024)
- Daily Doctrine: A One-Year Guide to Systematic Theology (October, 2024)
- The Nicene Creed: What You Need to Know about the Most Important Creed Ever Written (April, 2025
- The Biggest Story Advent: 25 Lift-the-Flap Devotions for Families (October, 2025)
