= Northwestern College (Iowa) =

Christian college in Orange City, Iowa, US

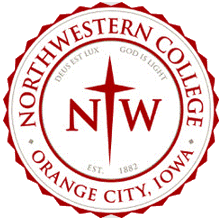
- Former names: Northwestern Classical Academy (1882–1928); Northwestern Junior College (1928–1961)
- Motto: "God Is Light" (Deus Est Lux)
- Type: Private college
- Established: 1882; 144 years ago
- Religious affiliation: Reformed Church in America (RCA)
- Academic affiliations: Council for Christian Colleges and Universities (CCCU)
- Endowment: $75.1 million (2021)
- President: Greg Christy
- Academic staff: 84 (full time)
- Administrative staff: 140 (full time)
- Undergraduates: 1,162 (fall 2023)
- Postgraduates: 543 (fall 2023)
- Location: Orange City, Iowa, United States; 42.999°N 96.057°W
- Campus: Rural, 100 acres (40 ha)
- Colors: Red & White
- Nickname: Red Raiders
- Sporting affiliations: NAIA – GPAC
- Website: nwciowa.edu
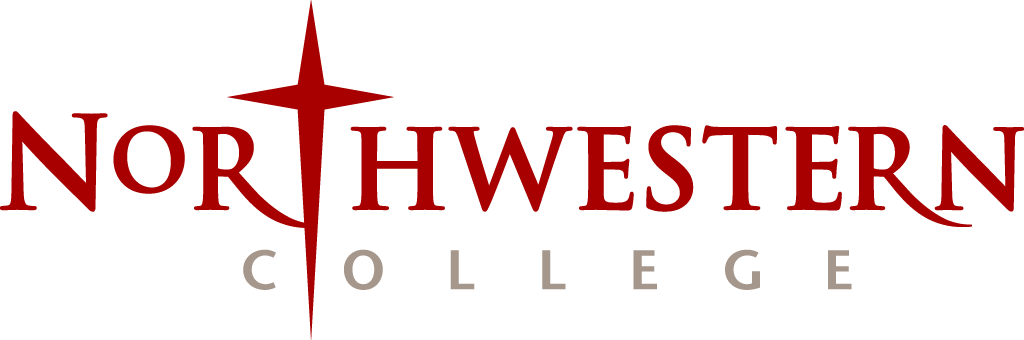

Northwestern College (NWC and informally Northwestern Iowa) is a private Christian college in Orange City, Iowa, United States, that is Reformed, evangelical and ecumenical. Established in 1882, it offers more than 135 academic programs and enrolls over 1,700 students in undergraduate, graduate and online programs.

Northwestern is accredited by the Higher Learning Commission, and the college's business, education, nursing and social work programs are accredited by their respective accreditation organizations. It is also a member of the Council for Christian Colleges and Universities. Northwestern's athletic teams compete in the National Association of Intercollegiate Athletics (NAIA) as the Raiders and are part of the Great Plains Athletic Conference (GPAC).

== History ==
In the early 1870s, Dutch immigrants in Pella, Iowa, moved to northwest Iowa and named their main settlement "Orange City" after the Dutch royal house. A decade later, the town's residents, led by local businessman Henry Hospers and the Rev. Seine Bolks, the first pastor of First Reformed Church, started a Christian classical academy to prepare students for college and ultimately the ministry. Northwestern Classical Academy was formally incorporated on July 19, 1882. Enrollment grew from 25 students in the first year to approximately 70 within a decade. Zwemer Hall, the first permanent building, was erected in 1894 and is now listed on the National Register of Historic Places.

In 1928, Northwestern Junior College was established. It became a four-year teacher-training college in 1961, the same year the academy ceased operation. Four years later, the board of trustees approved the development of a liberal arts program. Enrollment doubled to more than 760 in the 1960s, and the North Central Association of Colleges and Schools granted Northwestern College accreditation in 1970.

During the past two decades, Northwestern's enrollment has grown approximately 30%. Twice, a member of Northwestern's faculty was named Iowa Professor of the Year by the Carnegie Foundation for the Advancement of Teaching and the Council for Advancement and Support of Education (CASE): Spanish professor Piet Koene in 2004, and theatre professor Jeff Barker in 2006. Academic offerings have expanded to include online and graduate degree programs, and more than $50 million has been invested in new construction and other campus improvements since 2013.

=== Presidents ===
- Jacob Heemstra (1928–1951)
- Frederick Wezeman (1951–1955)
- Preston Stegenga (1955–1966)
- Lars Granberg (1966–1975)
- Virgil Rowenhorst (1975–1979)
- Friedhelm Radandt (1979–1985)
- James Bultman (1985–1999)
- Bruce Murphy (2001–2007)
- Gregory Christy (2008–present)

== Enrollment ==
Northwestern's fall 2023 enrollment totaled 1,715 students, of whom 1,162 were undergraduate students, 543 were graduate students, and 10 were enrolled in the Northwestern NEXT program. Traditional undergraduate students came from 25 states, with 42% from outside of Iowa. 52% are men and 48% are women. 11% are students of color, and another 3% are international students from 23 countries. Students, faculty and staff come from more than 40 Christian denominations.

== Academics ==
Northwestern's Vision for Learning includes four goals: to help students learn to trust, love and worship God; engage ideas; connect knowledge and experience; and respond to God's call. NWC offers more than 135 programs of study, is accredited by the Higher Learning Commission, and awards Bachelor of Arts (B.A.), Bachelor of Science in Nursing (B.S.N.), Master of Arts (M.A.), Master of Education (M.Ed.), and Master of Science (M.S.) degrees. In addition, NWC's business program is accredited by the International Accreditation Council for Business Education; its education program is accredited by the Iowa Department of Education; its nursing program is accredited by the Commission on Collegiate Nursing Education and fully approved by the Iowa Board of Nursing; its social work program is accredited by the Council on Social Work Education; and its physician assistant program has Accreditation-Provisional status from the ARC-PA.

Bachelor's degree programs provide the choice of majors, minors, pre-professional programs, and career concentrations, as well as the online options of an RN-to-BSN program and a bachelor's degree in early childhood education. Graduate programs leading to master's degrees include online programs in education, mental health counseling and school counseling, as well as an in-person physician assistant program.

=== Study abroad ===
Northwestern offers two study abroad programs: the Oman Semester and the Romania Semester. Through NWC's partnerships with other institutions and organizations—including the Council for Christian Colleges and Universities (CCCU)—Northwestern students can take advantage of more than 20 additional off-campus study programs in countries that include Costa Rica, England, France, Italy, Jordan, Spain and Uganda, as well as U.S. programs based in Los Angeles, Nashville, Baltimore and Michigan.

=== Northwestern NEXT ===
Northwestern offers a two-year program for students with intellectual or developmental disabilities that is recognized as a comprehensive transition program (CTP) by the U.S. Department of Education.

== Campus ==
Northwestern College is located in Orange City, Iowa, a community of more than 6,000 residents in Sioux County, Iowa. Orange City has been ranked the fourth-most livable small town in America by TheTravel.com and one of the 100 Best Small Towns in the U.S. by Livability.com. Northwestern's 100-acre campus is a few blocks south of Orange City's downtown at the intersection of Highway 10 and Albany Avenue and features a campus green that stretches from the DeWitt Family Science Center to De Valois Stadium. More than $50 million has been invested in new construction and other improvements since 2013.

=== Academic facilities ===
Northwestern's DeWitt Family Science Center, built in 2019 for $24.5 million, anchors the west edge of campus. Lining either side of the campus green are Van Peursem Hall, where the majority of classes are held; the DeWitt Learning Commons, the college's library; and the DeWitt Music Hall, with rehearsal and practice rooms for NWC's band, vocal and orchestra students. Connected to DeWitt Music Hall is Christ Chapel, a 900-seat auditorium where chapel and concerts are held. Anchoring the east end of campus are the Korver Visual Arts Center, home of the Te Paske Gallery, and the DeWitt Theatre Arts Center, with two performance spaces: the England Proscenium Theatre and the Allen Black Box Theatre.

=== Administrative facilities ===
The Vogel Welcome Center, located just inside Northwestern's main entrance, is a first stop for visitors, including prospective students and their parents. A main boulevard leads toward Zwemer Hall, which houses the offices of the president and vice president for academic affairs; business, registrar's, advancement and human resources offices; Graduate & Professional Studies staff; and print room. West of Zwemer Hall is the Ramaker Center, where the student life, campus ministry, Compass Center for Career & Calling and Bridge Center for Intercultural Development are located.

=== Student facilities ===
Student eating options include the DeWitt Cafeteria, the Hub Raider Grille in the Rowenhorst Student Center (RSC), and Common Grounds café in the DeWitt Learning Commons. Also located in the RSC are the Northwestern bookstore, mailroom, and Wellness Center.

86% of Northwestern's traditional undergraduate students live on campus. Residence halls are staffed by professional resident directors and student resident assistants and mix first-year students with upperclassmen/women. Each residence hall maintains a number of hall-specific traditions. There are also two student apartment complexes for juniors, seniors and some sophomores.

- Bolks Apartments
- Christy Suites (women, opened in fall 2024)
- Colenbrander Hall (men, closed in fall 2024)
- Courtyard Village Apartments
- Hospers Hall (men)
- North Suites (men)
- Smith Hall (men)
- Stegenga Hall (women)

=== Athletic facilities ===
Northwestern's athletic facilities include the Bultman Center, Juffer Athletic Fieldhouse, DeWitt Fitness Center, and De Valois Stadium. De Valois Stadium seats 3,100 for Northwestern football games, home track meets, and marching band competitions. The Bultman Center contains coaches' offices, athletic training facilities, classrooms and locker rooms, as well as a 2,200-seat gymnasium. The Juffer Athletic Fieldhouse features an indoor practice arena for the baseball, softball and soccer teams, as well as the Korver Athletic Performance Center weight room for Raider athletes and a golf practice room. Northwestern students work out in the DeWitt Fitness Center and compete on intramural teams that play in the center's 4-court area.

== Athletics ==
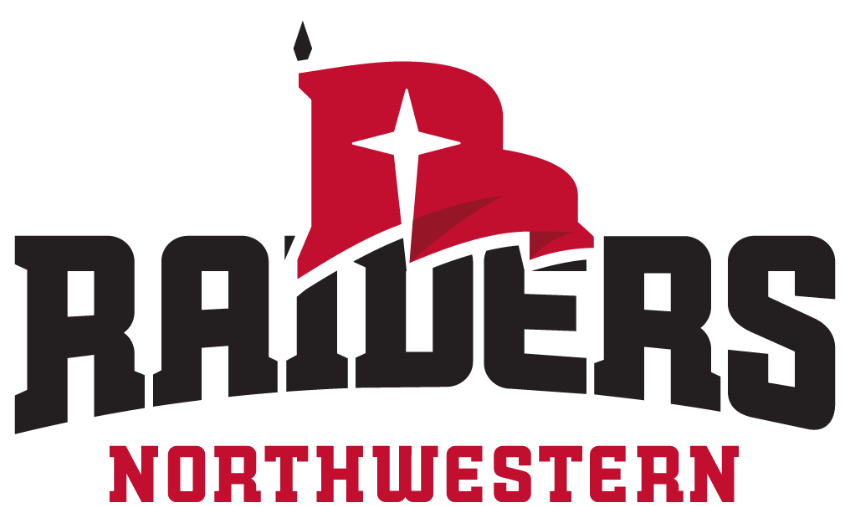
Northwestern athletics logo

Northwestern College's athletic teams are called the Red Raiders. Northwestern is a member of the National Association of Intercollegiate Athletics (NAIA), and has competed in the Great Plains Athletic Conference (GPAC) since 1992.

The Raiders compete in 22 intercollegiate varsity sports. Men's sports include baseball, basketball, cross country, football, golf, soccer, tennis, track & field (indoor and outdoor teams), and wrestling. Women's sports include basketball, cross country, dance, golf, soccer, softball, tennis, track & field (indoor and outdoor teams), and volleyball. Co-ed sports include cheerleading and esports.

=== Accomplishments ===
The Raiders have won 15 national championships: 10 by teams and five by individuals. In 2001, both the men's and women's basketball teams won the national title, the first time an NAIA school accomplished the feat and, at that time, only the second instance in collegiate history. (Central Missouri State, an NCAA school now known as the University of Central Missouri, first accomplished a double national title in 1984.)

==== National champions ====
National Championships
Team (10)
Sport	Year	Head Coach	Tournament
Basketball (women's)	2001	Earl Woudstra	NAIA DII
Basketball (women's)	2008	Earl Woudstra	NAIA DII
Basketball (women's)	2010	Earl Woudstra	NAIA DII
Basketball (women's)	2011	Earl Woudstra	NAIA DII
Basketball (women's)	2012	Chris Yaw	NAIA DII
Basketball (men's)	2001	Kris Korver	NAIA DII
Basketball (men's)	2003	Kris Korver	NAIA DII
Football	1973	Larry Korver	NAIA DII
Football	1983	Larry Korver	NAIA DII
Football	2022	Matt McCarty	NAIA
Individual (5)
Sport	Year	Athlete	Event
Outdoor Track & Field	1969	Fernando Abugattus	high jump
Outdoor Track & Field	2001	Jacob Koczman	400 meters
Outdoor Track & Field	2015	Karen Ettleman	Heptathlon
Indoor Track & Field	2001	Jacob Koczman	600 meters
Indoor Track & Field	2012	Matt Huesman	High Jump

== Notable people ==
=== Alumni ===
- Bob Boerigter (1970) – Former Northwest Missouri State University athletic director and Mid-America Intercollegiate Athletics Association commissioner
- Zach Dieken (2012) – Iowa state representative
- Kelvin Korver (1972) – NFL defensive tackle, drafted in the second round of the 1972 NFL draft, who played three seasons for the Oakland Raiders
- Cora Vander Broek (2000) – Tony Award-nominated actress
- Bob Vander Plaats (1985) – Teacher, educational administrator, author, former state Republican Party gubernatorial candidate and political activist, who is also the president and CEO of The Family Leader, a Christian social action organization
- Skyler Wheeler (2015) – Iowa state representative

=== Staff and faculty ===
- James Bultman – Former Northwestern College president, former president of Hope College in Holland, Michigan
- B. D. Dykstra – Former professor, pacifist, pastor and poet
- A. J. Muste – Instructor of classical languages (1905–1906), pacifist, and labor and civil rights activist
