= Wendell Chino =

Native American minister and politician

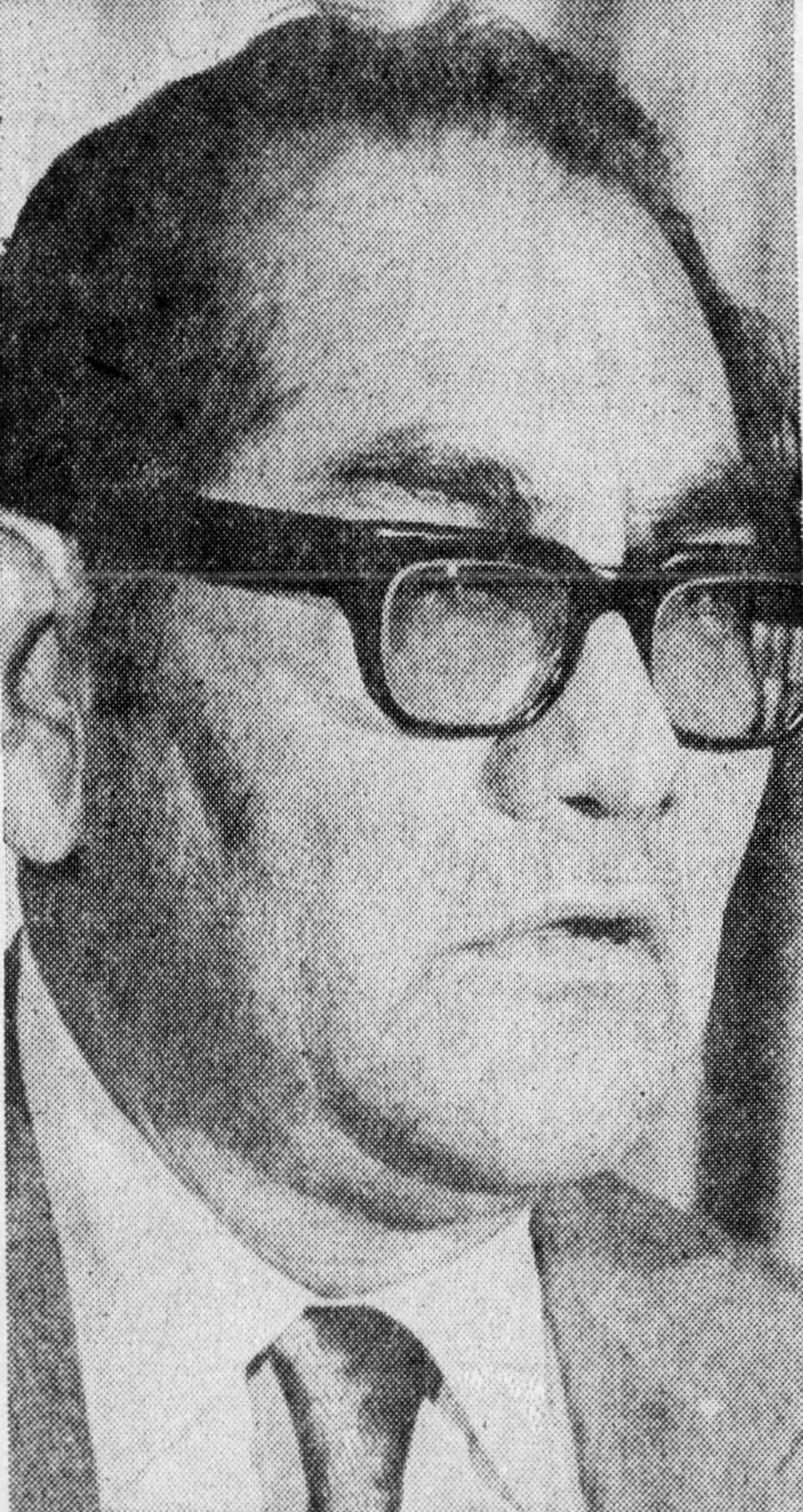
- Chino in 1975

President of the Mescalero Apache Nation
- In office 1965–1998
- Preceded by: Himself as chairman
- Succeeded by: Sara Misquez

Chairman of the Mescalero Apache Nation
- In office 1955–1965
- Succeeded by: Himself as president

Personal details
- Born: December 25, 1923 Mescalero Reservation, New Mexico, U.S.
- Died: November 4, 1998 (aged 74) Santa Monica, California, U.S.
- Education: Santa Fe Indian School; Western Theological Seminary

Wendell Chino (December 25, 1923 - November 4, 1998) was an Apache minister known for his defense of tribal sovereignty who served as the leader of the Mescalero Nation for over 40 years. An autocrat and staunch capitalist, Chino fought to improve the reservation's standard of living and foster economic self-sustainability. His policies developed many tribal-owned businesses, including the Ski Apache resort. He is also known to have served as chair of National Congress of American Indians and an associate pastor of the Mescalero Reformed Church for 4 years.

== Early life and education ==
Wendell Chino was born on December 25, 1923, in Mescalero, New Mexico, to the Mescalero Apache Nation as the fifth out of 11 children. Eleven previous years to his birth, Chino's parents were freed by the U.S Army as previous prisoners of war. Chino was mentioned in the annual report of the Board of Domestic Missions of 1939 when he was just 16 years old. This was highlighting Indian leadership and recognized him as "a school boy who is being trained to be a general helper at the mission and whom it is hoped will develop into a leader as he grows older." Not much else is known about his early child hood, but after attending the Indian school in Santa Fe, New Mexico, Chino continued his education at Central College in Pella, Iowa due to a grant from the Reformed Church. He then returned to Mescalero after his first year of college and was hired by Ten Haken as an assistant vacation Bible school teacher and to preach the Bible. He did not enjoy this and wanted to quit, however Ten Haken reminded him that Christ depends on Christian workers to resolve issues. He then proceeded to return to a Cook Christian Training School in Phoenix, Arizona. Following this, he attended Western Theological Seminary and graduated in 1951.

== Pastoral and business career ==
June 1951, Chino was ordained and accepted to be an associate minister to Ten Haken. He continued to serve for a year as an associate to the Reverend Harvey Calsbeek when Haken left. During this time he had become more involved in tribal leadership where he was elected to join the tribe's business committee. This committee performed business affairs relating to the tribe. He became the chair of the business committee in 1955 where he resigned as a pastor. The tribe adopted a council form of government during his time as chair 1955 until 1965.

== National Indian Council on Aging ==
Wendell Chino was a member of the nonprofit organization National Indian Council on Aging (NICOA). This organization was founded by members of National Tribal Chairman's Association in 1976 in Phoenix, Arizona. A meeting was held run by Chino where 171 tribes and 1,500 American Indians and Alaska Natives came together to express their concerns and desires for a better life. Other members included Joe DeLaCruz (Quinault). With this organization, Chino and others advocated for better social services, comprehensive health, and the economic well-being of Alaska Natives and American Indians.

== Tribal chairman ==
In 1965 he was elected as tribal chairman (president) in the new system and continued to be re-elected 16 more times, each time serving 2-years. He was known for his advancement of "red capitalism". New levels of economic prosperity was achieved while Chino served. He led the development of a new school, ski run, community center, fishing industry, lumbar industry, the Inn of the Mountain Gods resort, and Casino Apache. Chino was known for saying "The Navajos make rugs, the Pueblos make pottery, and the Mescaleros make money". This was due to Chino winning reparations from the US Government and opposing the idea to divide funds to individual tribal members and instead that the funds be used to create tribal industries. In 1975, Chino had a statement presented by Bruce Townsend regarding the repeal by Congress of Public Law 83-280. In this statement he expressed how this law has brought suffering among the tribal community. Chino is known as a "benevolent dictator" along with Roger Jourdain for their approaches in the Indian rights movement. On March 19–20, 1979, Chino appeared in court hearing along with Clyde Bellecourt, Theodore Means, and Barbara Namias to address National Indian Civil Rights Issues.

== National recognition ==
Chino's actions reached national recognition; his ability to advocate for Indian self-determination, sovereignty and rights, and the insistence that the federal government acknowledge and respect the treaties in regards to the Indian nations lands and resources. He was elected into the National Congress of American Indians as president for 2 terms representing 130 tribes. He was known for creating controversy when he negotiated with the US Government to store nuclear waste on a part of the Mescalero reservation which caused great conflict on the reservation. However, this never came about. Wendell Chino was also recognized for his great involvement in the American Indian gaming industry. Through this gaming industry he felt that it would help bring Native people in the modern world. In doing this, he generated a great deal of revenue and was recognized all over the country.

== Later life ==
Chino remained connected with the Reformed Church and friends with the pastors. Chino died on November 4, 1998, from two heart attacks at the UCLA Medical Center. Previous to his death, Chino wished that the pastor of the Reformed church would preside, and this was fulfilled. His 2 1/2-hour funeral service was attended by more than two thousand people. Peter Domenici, US senator; Gary Johnson, governor of New Mexico; and Manuel Lujan, former secretary of the US Department of the Interior all spoke at his service.

== Bibliography ==
- Koopman, LeRoy. Taking the Jesus Road: The Ministry of the Reformed Church in America Among Native Americans. William B. Eerdmans Pub., 2005. pp. 245–247.
- Britten, Thomas A.. Voice of the Tribes: A History of the National Tribal Chairmen's Association. United States, University of Oklahoma Press, 2020.
- National Indian Civil Rights Issues: Hearing Before the United States Commission on Civil Rights. United States, The Commission, 1979.
- Indian Law Enforcement Improvement Act of 1975: Hearings Before the Subcommittee on Indian Affairs of the Committee on Interior and Insular Affairs, United States Senate, Ninety-fourth Congress, First Session, on S. 2010, a Bill Providing for the Improvement of Law Enforcement and the Determination of Civil and Criminal Jurisdiction and Law in Indian Country, and for Other Purposes. United States, U.S. Government Printing Office, 1975.
- New Mexican Lives: Profiles and Historical Stories. United States, University of New Mexico Press, Published, 2002.
- Chino, Wendell | Encyclopedia.com. www.encyclopedia.com/history/encyclopedias-almanacs-transcripts-and-maps/chino-wendell.
- “Wendell Chino; Mescalero Apache Tribal Leader - Los Angeles Times.” Los Angeles Times, 3 Mar. 2019, www.latimes.com/archives/la-xpm-1998-nov-06-mn-40076-story.html.
- Native Voices Interview: Wendell Chino. nvinterviews.nlm.nih.gov/interviews/clips/364.
- “Our History.” NICOA - National Indian Council on Aging, www.nicoa.org/about-us/history.
- National Indian Council on Aging: Then (Creation of NICOA) and Now (the Affordable Care Act – ACA) | Diverse Elders Coalition. 30 Sept. 2013, diverseelders.org/2013/09/30/national-indian-council-on-aging-then-creation-of-nicoa-and-now-the-affordable-care-act-aca-2.
