= Sarah Coakley =

English Anglican theologian (born 1951)

The Reverend Sarah Coakley FBA
- Born: Sarah Anne Furber; 10 September 1951 (age 75); London, England
- Spouse: James F. Coakley (m. 1975)

Ecclesiastical career
- Religion: Christianity (Anglican)
- Church: Church of England; Episcopal Church (United States)
- Ordained: 2000 (deacon); 2001 (priest)

Academic background
- Education: New Hall, Cambridge; Harvard University
- Thesis: The Limits and Scope of the Christology of Ernst Troeltsch (1983)
- Influences: Gregory of Nyssa; Teresa of Ávila; John of the Cross; Ernst Troeltsch; John Robinson; Brian Gerrish; Maurice Wiles; Mary Douglas

Academic work
- Discipline: Theology
- Sub-discipline: Patristics; philosophical theology; philosophy of religion; systematic theology
- School or tradition: Analytic theology; Anglo-Catholicism; Christian feminism
- Institutions: Lancaster University; Oriel College, Oxford; Harvard University; University of Cambridge
- Doctoral students: J. Todd Billings
- Website: sarahcoakley.com

Sarah Anne Coakley FBA (born 10 September 1951) is an English Anglican priest, systematic theologian, and philosopher of religion with interdisciplinary interests. She became an honorary professor at the Logos Institute, the University of St Andrews, after retiring from the position of Norris–Hulse Professor of Divinity (2007–2018) at the University of Cambridge. She was a visiting professorial fellow (2019–22) then honorary professor at the Australian Catholic University, and an honorary fellow of Oriel College, Oxford.

== Early life and education ==
Born as Sarah Anne Furber on 10 September 1951 in the affluent area of Blackheath, London, Coakley attended the fee-paying Blackheath High School. Following this, she spent a year teaching English and Latin in Lesotho. Her education continued at New Hall, Cambridge (now Murray Edwards College; BA, first-class honours, 1973), and at Harvard Divinity School (ThM, 1975), to which she went as a Harkness Fellow. Her PhD on Ernst Troeltsch is also from the University of Cambridge (1983).

== Career ==
=== Academic career ===
Coakley has taught at Lancaster University (1976–1991), Oriel College, Oxford (1991–1993), and Harvard University in the divinity school (1993–2007; as Mallinckrodt Professor of Divinity, 1995–2007). She was a visiting professor of religion at Princeton University (2003–2004).

In 2006, she was elected the Norris–Hulse Professor of Divinity at the University of Cambridge (the first woman appointed to this chair) and took up the position in 2007. In 2011, she became deputy chair of the School of Arts and Humanities with a four-year appointment on the general board of the university. She retired as Norris–Hulse Professor in 2018 and was made professor emeritus. She has been an honorary professor at the Logos Institute and the University of St Andrews since 2018 and a visiting professorial fellow at the Australian Catholic University since 2019.

Coakley's teaching and research interests cover a number of disciplines cognate to systematic theology, including the philosophy of religion, the philosophy of science, patristics, feminist theory, and the intersections of law and medicine with religion. Her contributions to these areas have generally been by way of co-ordinating research projects and editing or co-editing collections of papers. It was through these collaborative projects that her profile initially gained a level of international prominence. At the time of her appointment to the Norris–Hulse chair in Cambridge in 2006, Coakley had published her doctoral thesis and her widely discussed monograph Powers and Submissions.

From 2005 to 2008, Coakley co-directed, with Martin A. Nowak, the "Evolution and Theology of Cooperation" project at Harvard University sponsored by the Templeton Foundation, out of which has come a co-edited volume, Evolution, Games, and God: The Principle of Cooperation. An earlier interdisciplinary project on "Pain and Its Transformations", undertaken with Arthur Kleinman at Harvard (as part of the Mind, Brain, Behavior Initiative), produced Pain and Its Transformations: The Interface of Biology and Culture (co-ed. with Kay Kaufman Shelemay, Harvard UP, 2007).

She delivered the Gifford Lectures in Aberdeen, Scotland, in 2012.

She holds honorary degrees from Lund University, St Andrews, University of St Michael's College, Toronto, and Heythrop College, London. In July 2019, she was elected a Fellow of the British Academy (FBA), the United Kingdom's national academy for the humanities and social sciences.

=== Ordained ministry ===
Coakley was ordained in the Church of England as a deacon in 2000 and as a priest in 2001. She has assisted in parishes in Waban, Massachusetts, and at the Church of St Mary and St Nicholas, Littlemore, Oxford, England (where she served her title). Her training for the priesthood included periods working in a hospital and a prison. In 2011 she was appointed an honorary canon of Ely Cathedral where she assisted with the morning office and Eucharist until 2018. Coakley now lives in the US, but returns to the UK every year for a period in the summer during which she has permission to officiate at St Barnabas Church, Jericho, Oxford.

In 2005 Coakley co-founded, with Sam Wells, the Littlemore Group of scholar-priests. The group writes accessible theological texts from the perspective of parish ministry. In 2012, she was invited to speak to the House of Bishops regarding a vote on consecrating women bishops.

== Major themes ==
Coakley works within the fields of systematic theology and philosophy of religion, along with interdisciplinary work on natural theology with scholars from the fields of biology and mathematics. She writes on Christology, particularly themes around the identity of Christ and apophaticism. Coakley publishes on theology of the body and mystical theology, particularly looking at feminism and postmodern secular culture from this perspective. She is a scholar of Gregory of Nyssa and patristic theology. Most recently, Coakley has been working on a series of systematic theology texts she calls théologie totale, which began with God, Sexuality and the Self published in 2013.

== Personal life ==
Coakley's father, F. Robert Furber, was a lawyer, and her mother, Anne Furber, was a teacher. In 1975, Coakley married James F. Coakley, a Syriac scholar and fine printer. They have two daughters, Edith Coakley Stowe and Agnes Coakley Cox, who are respectively a lawyer and a classical singer. They attended the Buckingham, Browne and Nichols School. Her mother, Anne Furber, died in July 2015. Her father, the London lawyer F. Robert Furber, died in June 2016. One of her brothers was a legal advisor to the Duchy of Cornwall and clubman. Her other brother is a barrister.

== Published works ==
=== Books authored ===
- Christ Without Absolutes: A Study of the Christology of Ernst Troeltsch. Oxford: Clarendon Press. 1988. ISBN 978-0-19-826670-9.
- Powers and Submissions: Spirituality, Philosophy and Gender. Oxford: Blackwell Publishers. 2002. doi:10.1002/9780470693407. ISBN 978-0-631-20735-1.
- Sacrifice Regained: Reconsidering the Rationality of Religious Belief. Cambridge, England: Cambridge University Press. 2012. ISBN 978-1-107-40224-9.
- God, Sexuality, and the Self: An Essay 'On the Trinity'. Cambridge, England: University of Cambridge Press. 2013. doi:10.1017/CBO9781139048958. ISBN 978-1-139-04895-8.
- The New Asceticism: Sexuality, Gender and the Quest for God. London: Bloomsbury Continuum. 2015. ISBN 978-1-4411-0322-2.
- Sensing God? Reconsidering the Patristic Doctrine of "Spiritual Sensation" for Contemporary Theology and Ethics. Marquette University Press. 2022. ISBN 9781626005143.
- The Broken Body: Israel, Christ and Fragmentation. Wiley Blackwell. 2024. ISBN 9781405189231.

=== Books edited ===
- The Making and Remaking of Christian Doctrine: Essays in Honour of Maurice Wiles. Edited with Pailin, David. Oxford: Clarendon Press. 1993. ISBN 978-0-19-826739-3.
- Religion and the Body. Editor. Cambridge, England: Cambridge University Press. 1997. ISBN 978-0-521-36669-4
- Re-Thinking Gregory of Nyssa. Editor. Oxford: Blackwell Publishing. 2003. ISBN 978-1-4051-0637-5.
- Pain and Its Transformations: The Interface of Biology and Culture. Edited with Shelemay, Kay Kaufman. Cambridge, Massachusetts: Harvard University Press. 2007. ISBN 978-0-674-02456-4.
- Praying for England: Priestly Presence in Contemporary Culture. Edited with Wells, Samuel. London: Continuum. 2008. ISBN 978-0-567-03230-0
- Re-Thinking Dionysius the Areopagite. Edited with Stang, Charles M. Chichester, England: Wiley-Blackwell. 2009. ISBN 978-1-4051-8089-4
- The Spiritual Senses: Perceiving God in Western Christianity. Edited with Gavrilyuk, Paul L. Cambridge, England: Cambridge University Press. 2012. doi:10.1017/CBO9781139032797. ISBN 978-1-139-03279-7.
- Fear and Friendship: Anglicans Engaging with Islam. Edited with Ward, Frances. London: Continuum. 2012. ISBN 978-1-4411-0149-5.
- Faith, Rationality and the Passions. Editor. Chichester, England: Wiley-Blackwell. 2012. ISBN 978-1-118-32199-7.
- Evolution, Games and God: The Principle of Cooperation. Edited with Nowak, Martin A. Cambridge, Massachusetts: Harvard University Press. ISBN 978-0-674-04797-6.
- For God's Sake: Re-Imagining Priesthood and Prayer in a Changing Church. Edited with Martin, Jessica. Norwich, England: Canterbury Press. ISBN 978-1-84825-814-3.
- Spiritual Healing: Science, Meaning and Discernment. Editor. Grand Rapids MI: Eerdmans, 2020. ISBN 9781786221896
- The Vowed Life: The Promise and Demand of Baptism. Edited with Bullimore, Matthew. Norwich: Canterbury Press, 2023. ISBN 9780802870933

== See also ==
- Philosophy of religion § Analytic philosophy of religion

Academic offices
| Preceded by John Barton | Hulsean Lecturer; 1991–1992 | Succeeded by Oliver O'Donovan |
| Preceded by Gordon D. Kaufman | Mallinckrodt Professor of Divinity; 1995–2007 | Succeeded by |
| Preceded by Denys Turner | Norris–Hulse Professor of Divinity; 2007–2018 | Succeeded by Catherine Pickstock |
| Preceded by Alister McGrath | Gifford Lecturer at the University of Aberdeen; 2012 | Succeeded by David N. Livingstone |
| Preceded by Cornelis van der Kooi | Warfield Lecturer; 2015 | Succeeded by James N. Anderson |
| Preceded by J. Patout Burns | Costan Lecturer; 2019 | Most recent |
| Preceded by Robin Jensen | Costan Lecturer; 2019 | Most recent |
Professional and academic associations
| Preceded by Stephen R. L. Clark | President of the British Society for the Philosophy of Religion; 2013–2015 | Succeeded by Mark Wynn |
Other offices
| Preceded by Russell Re Manning | Boyle Lecturer; 2016 | Succeeded by Robert John Russell |
