= Kingdom Network =

- Classification: Protestant
- Orientation: Continental Reformed
- Governance: Presbyterian
- Region: United States and Canada
- Origin: 2021
- Separated from: Reformed Church in America
- Congregations: 46 (2026)
- Official website: kingdomnetworkusa.org

The Kingdom Network is a Reformed Christian denomination formed in 2021, by a group of churches that split from the Reformed Church in America.

== History ==
In the 2010s, the Reformed Church in America (RCA) faced internal conflicts to define its position on same-sex marriage and homosexuality.

In 2021, after failing to find an agreement among the internal groups, the denomination approved a restructuring of its classes (presbyteries), to regroup the churches according to their positions on marriage and sexuality.

This generated the dissatisfaction of the more conservative members, who saw with it the implicit permission for churches to celebrate same-sex marriage when they form classes that support this conduct.

In response, 5 churches separated from the denomination and formed the Kingdom Network. Another group that separated at the same time, and at for the same reason, was the Alliance of Reformed Churches, with about 125 churches.

== Doctrine ==
RR opposes same-sex marriage. However, it allows ordination of women and their churches opt for the practice of paedobaptism or credobaptism.
