= Kay Kaufman Shelemay =

Ethnomusicologist

- Title: G. Gordon Watts Professor of Music; Professor of African and African American Studies

Academic background
- Education: University of Michigan

Kay Kaufman Shelemay (born 1948) is the G. Gordon Watts Professor of Music and Professor of African and African American Studies at Harvard University. She received her PhD in Musicology from the University of Michigan and won a Guggenheim Fellowship in 2007. Shelemay was elected to the American Philosophical Society in 2013.

== Works ==
- Music, Ritual, and Falasha History (1986)
- ed. Garland Library of Readings in Ethnomusicology (Garland Publishing, 7 vols., 1990)
- A Song of Longing: An Ethiopian Journey (1991)
- Ethiopian Christian Chant: An Anthology with Peter Jeffery (3 vols., 1993–97)
- Let Jasmine Rain Down: Song and Remembrance Among Syrian Jews (University of Chicago Press, 1998)
- ed. Studies in Jewish Musical Traditions (2001)
- Soundscapes: Exploring Music in a Changing World (W.W. Norton, second edition 2006)
- co-ed. Pain and its Transformations: The Interface of Biology and Culture with Sarah Coakley (Harvard University Press, 2007)
- Sing and Sing On: Sentinel Musicians and the Making of the Ethiopian American Diaspora. University of Chicago Press, 2022.
