= Greenpoint Reformed Church =

Church in Brooklyn, New York

Coordinates: 40°43′45″N 73°57′18″W

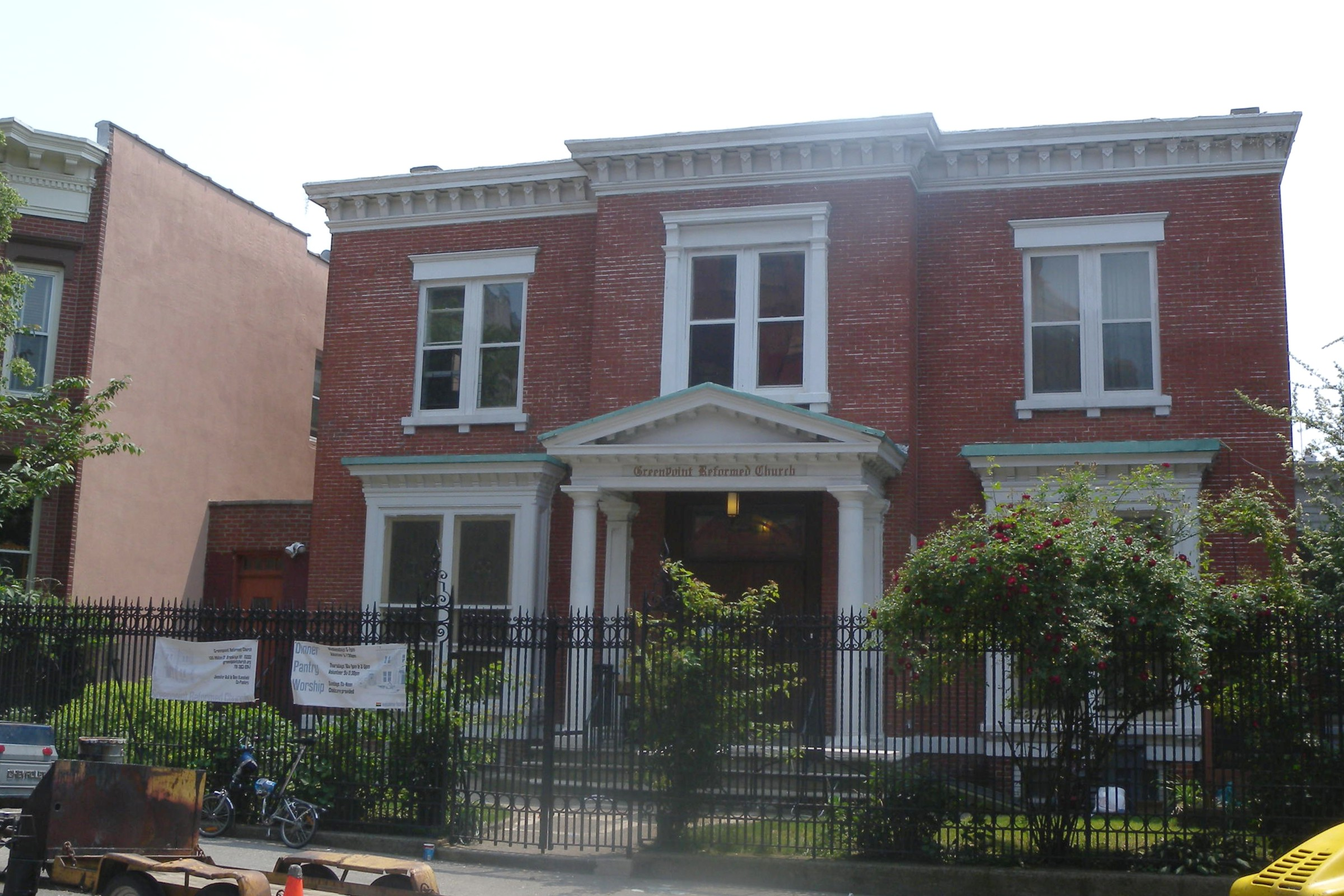

Greenpoint Church is a Reformed Church in America and United Church of Christ church at 136 Milton Street in the Greenpoint neighborhood of Brooklyn, New York. As of March 2012, it had a congregation of 80 people.

Its fireplace tilework includes historic porcelain plaques depicting Robert Fulton and Robert Livingston. According to a curator at the Metropolitan Museum of Art, the Union Porcelain Factory in Greenpoint probably manufactured the plaques in the 1870s. The Milton Street building had been a private residence built for Thomas C. Smith, owner of Brooklyn Union Gas Company, and later was home to the Greenpoint YMCA. The congregation has used the current building since it purchased it in 1942. Prior to that, the church was located in its original location 145 Kent Street, a structure dating to 1869 and which later became St. Elias Melkite Catholic Church.

The Reverend Ann Kansfield has been one of the church's pastors since 2003. Her wife, the Rev. Jennifer Aull, has been co-pastor since 2006. Kansfield and Aull were cofounders of the group Room For All.

The church hosts a dinner and soup kitchen for its local community. The church's food pantry program began in October 2007; it offers groceries to individuals and families, most of whom live in northern Brooklyn. A homeless shelter briefly opened at Greenpoint Reformed Church in November 2012, but a few months later moved to another neighborhood church.
