= I. John Hesselink =

American academic

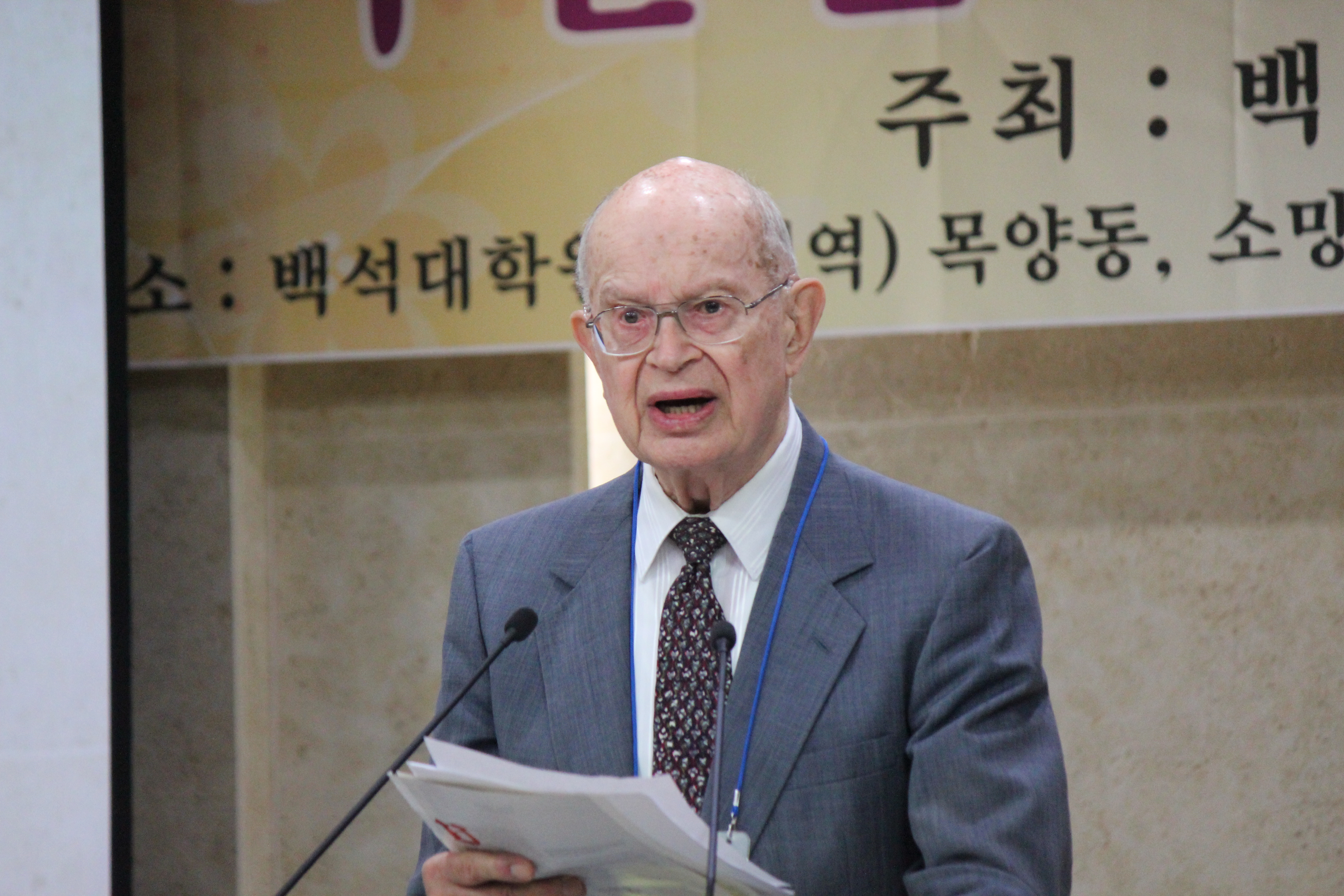
- Born: Ira John Hesselink; March 21, 1928; Grand Rapids, Michigan, USA
- Died: October 28, 2018 (aged 90); Holland, Michigan, USA
- Education: Central College; Western Theological Seminary; University of Basel
- Occupations: Theologian, professor
- Spouse: Etta ter Lou (m. 1951)
- Theological work
- Tradition or movement: Reformed
- Main interests: John Calvin

Ira John Hesselink Jr. (March 21, 1928 – October 28, 2018) was an American theologian, born in Grand Rapids, Michigan, USA.

An expert in John Calvin, he was Albertus C. Van Raalte Professor Emeritus of Systematic Theology at Western Theological Seminary in Holland, Michigan. After his retirement, he was an honorary professor and continued to write a few books on John Calvin and lecture in Europe, South Korea, and Japan. He was a Dutch American theologian who served as a missionary in Japan after receiving theological education at Western Theological Seminary in Holland, Michigan. He wrote a book on Calvin's Catechism and several books and papers. In his contribution to a book on Calvin in the Cambridge Theologian Series, he wrote a paper on Calvin's theology. He was also president of Karl Barth Society of North America, founded in October 1972 in Toronto by a group of Canadian and American scholars of Karl Barth, inspired by his son Markus Barth.

Hesselink is survived by the family he loved: Etta, his wife of 67 years; five children and two grandchildren: John III (Nicaragua and Holland, MI), Ann (Del Mar, CA - husband Paul Naour and daughter Katherine Hesselink Hicks), Jud (Martinez, CA), Nathan (Vancouver, BC - wife Serra Hwang and son Braque) and Greg (New York, NY) - all of whom the carry-on his love of knowledge, music and the world at-large.

== Selected bibliography ==
- Hesselink, I. John (1983). On Being Reformed: Distinctive Characteristics and Common Misunderstandings. Ann Arbor, Michigan: Servant Books. ISBN 9780892831623.
- Hesselink, I. John (1992). Calvin's Concept of the Law. Princeton Theological Monograph Series. Allison Park, Pennsylvania: Pickwick Publications. ISBN 9781556350078.
- Hesselink, I. John (1997). Calvin's First Catechism: A Commentary. Louisville, Kentucky: Westminster John Knox Press. ISBN 9780585352312.
- Moore, Russell D.; Hesselink, I. John; Scaer, David; Baima, Thomas (2007). Understanding Four Views on the Lord's Supper. Grand Rapids, Michigan: Zondervan. ISBN 9780310262688.
- Beauty Given by Grace: The Biblical Prints of Sadao Watanabe
