= Carleton Naiche-Palmer =

President of the Mescalero Apache
- In office January 11, 2008 – 2010
- Vice President: ?
- Preceded by: Sara Misquez
- Succeeded by: Mark Chino

Personal details
- Born: June 22, 1947 Mescalero, New Mexico
- Died: December 12, 2010 (aged 63) El Paso, Texas
- Party: Democratic
- Spouse: Ada Rose (m. 1970)
- Children: 5

Carleton A. Naiche-Palmer (June 22, 1947 – December 12, 2010) was elected president of the Mescalero Apache Tribe in 2008. He served one term, until early 2010.

== Early life and education ==
Carleton Naiche-Palmer was born in 1947. He was a descendant of the Chiricahua Apache leaders Naiche and Cochise. Naiche-Palmer's father, Ignacius Palmer, was an artist.

Naiche-Palmer held a bachelor's degree in business from Western New Mexico University, a master's degree in business from Pepperdine University and a doctorate in social and economic development from Arbor University. He had resided in Albuquerque, New Mexico, for twenty-seven years.

== Marriage and family ==
In 1970 he married Ada Rose Enjady. They had five children together.

=== Career ===
Naiche-Palmer was the chairman of the board of directors for the Inn of the Mountain Gods Resort & Casino. He also served on the Mescalero tribal council.

At the time of his election, Naiche-Palmer was the owner and main partner in an advocacy firm which represented individuals before the Mescalero Apache Tribal Court. He was active in the American Indian Business and Technologies, All Indian Pueblo Council, Sandia National Laboratories, and National Indian Council on Aging.

=== President of the Mescalero ===
Carleton Naiche-Palmer was elected president of the Mescalero Apache in November 2007, defeating the incumbent Sara Misquez. He took office in early 2008. Naiche-Palmer was sworn in as the president of the Mescalero Apache on January 11, 2008.

Naiche-Palmer was defeated for re-election in the presidential primary held on September 29, 2009, coming in fifth place out of seven candidates. Former president Mark Chino finished in first place with 395 votes; former vice president Frederick Chino came in second with 253 votes; Ben Martinez was third with 247 votes; Naomi Sainz was fourth with 74 votes; Naiche-Palmer was fifth with 43 votes; Harlyn Geronimo was sixth with 40 votes, and A. Paul Ortega finished in seventh place with 26 votes. Mark Chino was elected president in the general election.

Carleton Naiche-Palmer died of natural causes at a hospital in El Paso, Texas, on December 12, 2010, at the age of 63. He was survived by Ada, his wife of 40 years; their five children; 18 grandchildren and great-grandchildren. He was predeceased by a son, Scott "Scotty" Ryan Palmer, who died on October 15, 2009.
