= James Osborne Arthur =

American missionary

Reverend James Osborne Arthur, Sr. (1887–1971) and his wife Katherine Arthur (1883–1960) were missionaries for the Reformed Church of America. While missionaries they photographed Native Americans in the American Southwest.

== Biography ==
Arthur was born in 1887. He married Katherine Arthur (1883–1960) and had the following children: Margaret Jean Arthur (1913- ), James Osborne Arthur, Jr. (1915–2002), John Paul Arthur (1917–1987), Robert Lee Arthur (1919–2000) and Kathryn Arthur (1923- ).

He was at the Winnebago Reservation in Nebraska in 1913 and among the Chiricahua and Mescalero Apaches in the Whitetail section of the Mescalero Apache Reservation in New Mexico from 1914 to 1919. Their images were inherited by their granddaughter, Barbara Jane Arthur Jacobs, and were donated to the National Museum of the American Indian by Barbara Jacobs and her son Dr. James A. Jacobs in 2007.
