= Sara Misquez =

Mescalero Apache president

Sara Jane Misquez

Mescalero Apache President leader
- Preceded by: Wendell Chino / Paul Ortega
- Succeeded by: Carleton Naiche-Palmer

Personal details
- Born: September 6, 1945 Mescalero, New Mexico
- Died: January 9, 2008 (aged 62) Near Tularosa, New Mexico
- Cause of death: Automobile accident
- Spouse: Gilbert Misquez
- Children: Two sons, one daughter
- Education: Haskell Indian Junior College, business degree

Sara Jane Misquez (September 6, 1945 – January 9, 2008) was an American Mescalero Apache Native American leader. Misquez served as the president of the Mescalero Apache of southern New Mexico.

== Early life ==
Evidently member of the same Mizquiz family of the famous chief Alsate, Sara Misquez was born on September 6, 1945, in Mescalero, New Mexico, but she was raised in Three Rivers, New Mexico. Her husband was Gilbert Misquez.

Misquez earned a degree in business from Haskell Indian Junior College, which is now known as the Haskell Indian Nations University, in Lawrence, Kansas.

== Mescalero presidency ==
Misquez was first appointed president of the Mescalero Apache in May 1999, following the death of the longtime leader of the tribe for 43 years, Wendell Chino on November 4, 1998, and the May 1999 ouster of Paul Ortega by the Mescalero Tribal Council after he served six months as president. Misquez, who was a longtime aide of Wendell Chino, went on to win the tribe's presidential election in August 1999.

Misquez was defeated for re-election in the 2001 election for president by Mark Chino, who is the son of former president Wendell Chino. However, the results of the election were thrown out by the Mascalero tribal council just two weeks later because of a controversy involving the voting machines.

Misquez won the new special presidential election, which was held in January 2002. She was defeated again by Mark Chino in the tribe's next presidential election in November 2003.

Misquez defeated Chino in the tribe's 2007 primary election when she received the most votes, followed by Carleton Naiche-Palmer. However, Naiche-Palmer went on to win the 2007 general election to become president of the Mescalero Apache.

Before Misquez became president, she also served as the tribe's administrator, council member and tribal secretary.

== Death ==
Sara Misquez died on January 9, 2008, in a one car crash on U.S. Route 70 near Tularosa, New Mexico. She was 62 years old. Her 1999 Oldsmobile sports utility vehicle was travelling east when it veered into the median and overturned. Misquez is survived by her husband, two sons, and one daughter. She was preceded in death by a son, Gilbert Ralph Misquez.

New Mexico Governor Bill Richardson released a statement on news of her death stating, "President Misquez led the Mescalero Apaches with honor and dignity. On behalf of all New Mexicans, I send my sincere condolences to President Misquez's family and friends."
