= Alliance of Reformed Churches =

Christian denomination

- Classification: Protestant
- Theology: Reformed
- Governance: Policy Governance
- Region: United States
- Origin: 2021
- Congregations: 192
- Official website: arc21.org

The Alliance of Reformed Churches is a Reformed Christian denomination formed in 2021, currently with 192 churches. The Alliance operates under a policy governance model. Alliance churches describe their mission as pursuing innovative ways to engage a changing world with the Gospel while holding to Reformed theology.

== History ==
In the 2010s, the Reformed Church in America (RCA) faced pressure to clarify its position on same-sex marriage and homosexuality. Specifically, there were disputes over what ramifications should exist over clergy conducting same sex weddings, which were being permitted by individual local classes [presbyteries] even while it was against a broader denominational doctrine and policy.

In 2021, after failing to find an agreement amongst the RCA's diverse membership, there emerged a growing dissatisfaction from the more conservative members, who saw with the RCA's inability to deal with enforcement as implicit permission for churches to celebrate same-sex marriage when they form classes that support this conduct.

In response, 55 congregations seeking a new direction departed the RCA in 2021 and formed the Alliance of Reformed Churches. The Alliance was initially co-led by Dan Ackerman and Tim Vink, who helped guide the denomination through its founding period. Following their tenure, Greg Alderman became the Executive Director. Since its formation, the Alliance has seen steady growth, welcoming other churches who shares its commitment to being a Reformed Evangelical family of churches.

== Doctrine ==
The Alliance affirms the Apostles' Creed, Athanasian Creed and Niceno-Constantinopolitan Creed. It considers the ordination of women as a matter for the individual church. However, the majority of local churches do not ordain female clergy.

It subscribes to the Heidelberg Catechism, the Belgic Confession, the Canons of Dort, and the Belhar Confession. It also subscribes to the Great Lakes Catechism on Marriage and Sexuality.

== Governance and Structure ==
The Alliance describes itself as "denominationally lean," favoring a streamlined organizational structure over a more centralized bureaucracy. The Alliance uses a Policy Governance model for governing. Congregations are grouped into eight Networks spread across the country. Under the Alliance's model, these Networks hold primary responsibility for encouraging and equipping local congregations, reflecting the organization's decentralized approach to church support and development.

== Strategic Priorities ==
The Alliance identifies three strategic priorities: making disciples, equipping leaders, and multiplying ministries.

== Ordination ==
The Alliance credentials its pastors through a program called Ordination Pathways, a competency-based framework rather than a traditional seminary requirement. Rather than functioning as a school, Ordination Pathways defines a set of competencies associated with ministerial maturity, and candidates progress toward ordination by demonstrating those competencies through formal coursework or through practical experience guided by an assigned support team. Ordination Pathways is intended to serve several types of candidates, including second-career pastors, pastors transferring ordination from other denominations, and lay leaders moving into professional ministry.
