= Western Theological Seminary =

Christian Reformed school in United States

Coordinates: 42.786°N 86.103°W

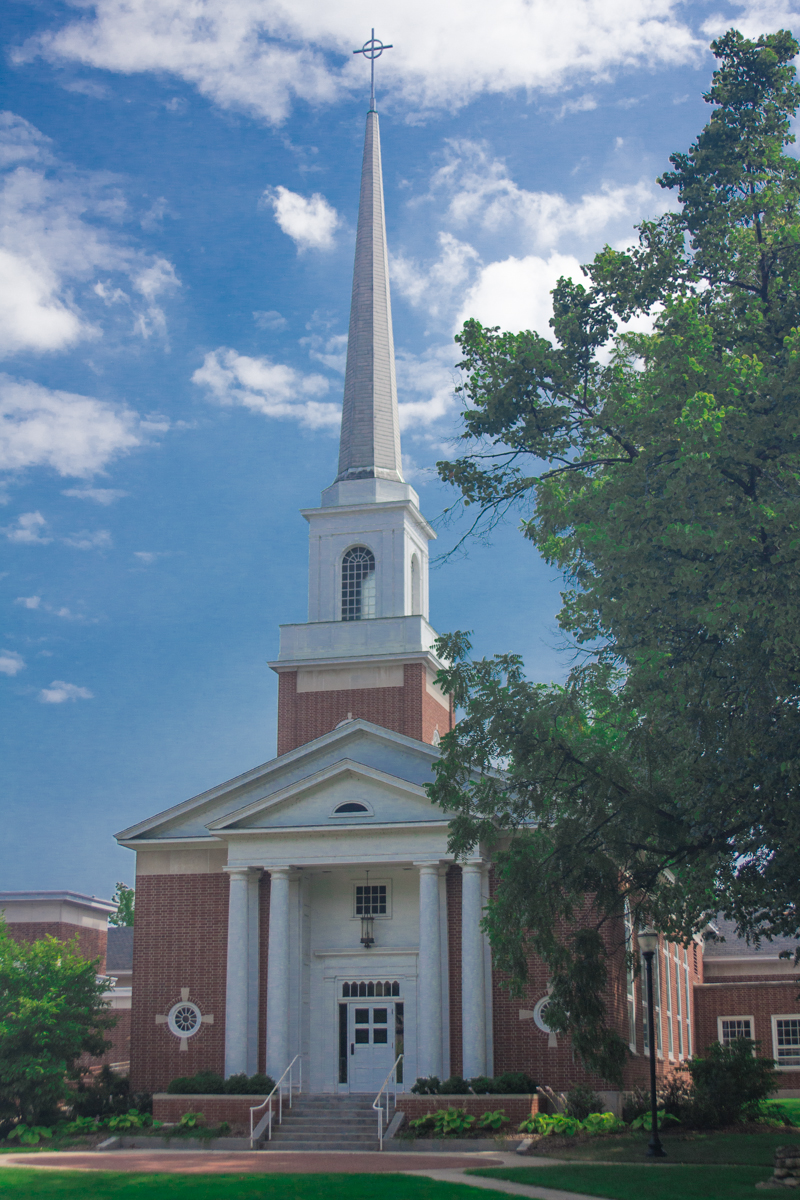
- Type: Private seminary
- Established: 1866
- Religious affiliation: Reformed Church in America
- President: Felix Theonugraha
- Location: Holland, Michigan, Michigan, United States
- Website: www.westernsem.edu

Michigan State Historic Site
- Designated: March 9, 1966

Western Theological Seminary (WTS) is a private Christian seminary in Holland, Michigan, United States. Established in 1866, it is affiliated with the Reformed Church in America.

The seminary offers professional and graduate degree programs for candidates for ministry, and to those pursuing careers in academia or non-theological fields. It was established to fill a need for theological education on the (then) western frontier of the Reformed Church in America. In its theological identity, Western Theological Seminary is evangelical, ecumenical and Reformed. Western Theological Seminary prepares students for ministry often involving ordination as well as for further graduate study, chaplaincy, missions, youth ministry, social service ministry, etc.

== History ==
Albertus van Raalte founded Hope College in Holland Michigan; believing that parents had a primary responsibility to educate their children and not the state. In 1866, seven students graduating from Hope College felt called to full-time Christian ministry following graduation. They wanted to pursue their theological training in West Michigan, so they made a petition to the General Synod of the Reformed Church to allow for theological training through the Hope College Religion Department. Permission was granted and Western Theological Seminary was established. Initially, the theological department within Hope College was used for theological education; but in 1884 following the synods approval the department was separated from Hope College and Western Theological Seminary was established as its own institution. In 2022, the seminary became independent, though retains a relation to the Reformed Church in America, the denomination that gave it life and sustenance for over 150 years. The seminary faculty, administration, and board continue to embrace the WTS Statement of Theological Identity which was adopted in 2018.

== Academics ==
The seminary is accredited by the Association of Theological Schools in the United States and Canada (ATS). It offers the Master of Divinity (MDiv), Master of Arts (MA), Master of Theology (ThM), Doctor of Ministry (DMin), and Graduate Certificates. The seminary also offers some programs in Spanish and through distance-learning.

=== Frederick Buechner connections ===
Among its student awards, Western Theological Seminary awards annual prizes for Excellence in Writing and Excellence in Preaching, named after the theologian and writer Frederick Buechner. Additionally, former seminary president and Henry Bast Professor of Preaching, Timothy Brown, has also delivered guest lectures on the topic of Buechner, including at the Buechner Institute at King University in 2013.

== Notable faculty ==
- J. Todd Billings, Gordon H. Girod Research Professor of Reformed Theology

== Notable alumni ==
- Wendell Chino, president of the Mescalero Apache Nation
- Martin De Haan, founder of Our Daily Bread Ministries
- Norman Kansfield, senior scholar at Drew University
- Stephen Kaziimba, Archbishop of Uganda
- Henry Collin Minton, scholar, minister
- Richard Mouw, president of Fuller Theological Seminary
- Robert H. Schuller, author, pastor
- Eugene Sutton, Episcopal Bishop of Maryland
- Robert E. Van Voorst, faculty at Western Theological Seminary
