= Reformed Church in America =

Reformed Protestant denomination in the Dutch tradition

- Coat of arms of the Reformed Church in America
- Classification: Mainline Protestant
- Orientation: Continental Dutch Reformed
- Theology: Reformed
- Polity: Presbyterian
- Full communion: UCC (since 1997); PCUSA (since 1997); ELCA (since 1997); CRC (since 2014)
- Associations: National Council of Churches; World Council of Churches; Canadian Council of Churches; Christian Churches Together; World Communion of Reformed Churches; Evangelical Fellowship of Canada; National Association of Evangelicals
- Region: Canada, U.S.
- Headquarters: Grand Rapids, Michigan, U.S.
- Origin: 1628 (first Dutch Reformed congregation organized in New Amsterdam); 1754 (American classis gains independence)
- Branched from: Dutch Reformed Church
- Separations: Christian Reformed Church in North America (separated 1857; further congregations join the CRC in 1882); Alliance of Reformed Churches (2021); Kingdom Network (2021); Foundation for Christian Living (1942; de facto)
- Congregations: 580 (2024)
- Members: 80,675 as of 2025
- Official website: www.rca.org
- Logo

The Reformed Church in America (RCA) is a mainline Reformed Protestant denomination in Canada and the United States. It has about 80,675 members. From its beginning in 1628 until 1819, it was the North American branch of the Dutch Reformed Church. In 2024, Pew Research estimated that approximately 0.1% of the US adult population, or about 260,000 people, self-identifies with the Reformed Church in America.

The RCA is a founding member of the National Council of Churches, the World Council of Churches (WCC), Christian Churches Together, and the World Communion of Reformed Churches (WCRC). Some parts of the denomination belong to the National Association of Evangelicals, the Canadian Council of Churches, and the Evangelical Fellowship of Canada. The denomination is in full communion with the Evangelical Lutheran Church in America, Presbyterian Church (USA), and United Church of Christ and is a denominational partner of the Christian Reformed Church in North America.

== Names ==
The Reformed Church in America is sometimes colloquially referred to as the Dutch Reformed Church in America, or simply as the Dutch Reformed Church when an American context has already been provided. In 1819, it incorporated as the Reformed Protestant Dutch Church. The current name was chosen in 1867.

== History ==
=== 17th century ===
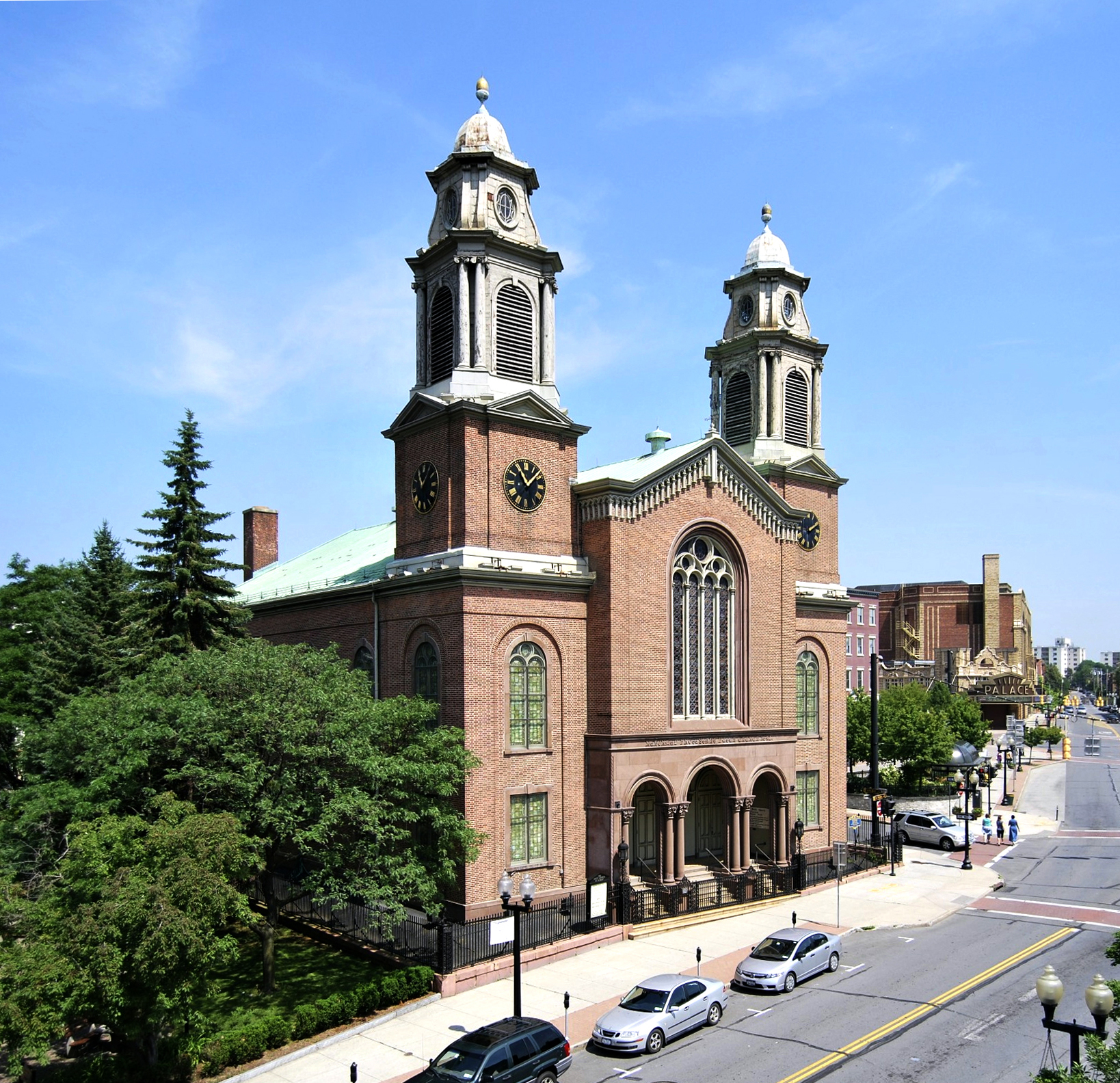
The First Reformed Church in Albany was founded in Albany, New York in 1642 to serve the patroonship of Rensselaerswyck; the current church was built in 1798.

The early settlers in the Dutch colony of New Netherland first held informal meetings for worship.

In 1628, Jonas Michaelius organized the first Dutch Reformed congregation in New Amsterdam, now New York City, called the Reformed Protestant Dutch Church, now The Collegiate Churches of New York. During Dutch rule, the RCA was the established church of the colony and was under the authority of the classis of Amsterdam. The Brookville Reformed Church remains one of the oldest churches in America.

=== 18th century ===
Even after the English captured the colony in 1664, all Dutch Reformed ministers were still trained in the Netherlands. Services in the RCA remained in Dutch until 1764.

In 1747, the church in the Netherlands had given permission to form an assembly in North America; in 1754, the assembly declared itself independent of the classis of Amsterdam. This American classis secured a charter in 1766 for Queens College (now Rutgers University) in New Jersey. In 1784 John Henry Livingston was appointed as professor of theology, marking the beginning of the New Brunswick Theological Seminary.

The Dutch-speaking community, including farmers and traders, prospered in the former New Netherlands, dominating New York City, the Hudson Valley, and parts of New Jersey while maintaining a significant presence in southeastern Pennsylvania, southwestern Connecticut, and Long Island.

In the early 18th century nearly 3,000 Palatine German refugees came to New York. Most worked first in English camps along the Hudson River to pay off their passage, paid by Queen Anne's government, before they were allowed land in the Schoharie and Mohawk Valleys. They created numerous German-speaking Lutheran and Reformed churches, such as those at Fort Herkimer and German Flatts. Thousands more immigrated to Pennsylvania in the 18th century. They used German as the language in their churches and schools for nearly 100 years, and recruited some of their ministers from Germany. By the early 20th century, most of their churches had joined the RCA.

During the American Revolution, a bitter internal struggle broke out in the Dutch Reformed church, with lines of division following ecclesiastical battles that had gone on for twenty years between the "coetus" and "conferentie" factions. One source indicates that defections may have occurred as early as 1737.

"Desolation pervaded many of the churches, whereas prior to 1737 good order was maintained in the churches, and peace and a good degree of prosperity were enjoyed. ...But in 1754, the Coetus of the previous year, having recommended the changing of the Coetus into a Classis with full powers, the opposition became violent, and the opponents were known as the Conferentie."

A spirit of amnesty made possible the church's survival after the war. The divisiveness was also healed when the church sent members on an extensive foreign missions program in the early 19th century.

In 1792, the classis adopted a formal constitution; and in 1794 the denomination held its first general synod. Following the American Civil War, in 1867 it formally adopted the name "Reformed Church in America". In the nineteenth century in New York and New Jersey, ethnic Dutch descendants struggled to preserve their European standards and traditions while developing a taste for revivalism and an American identity.

=== 19th century ===
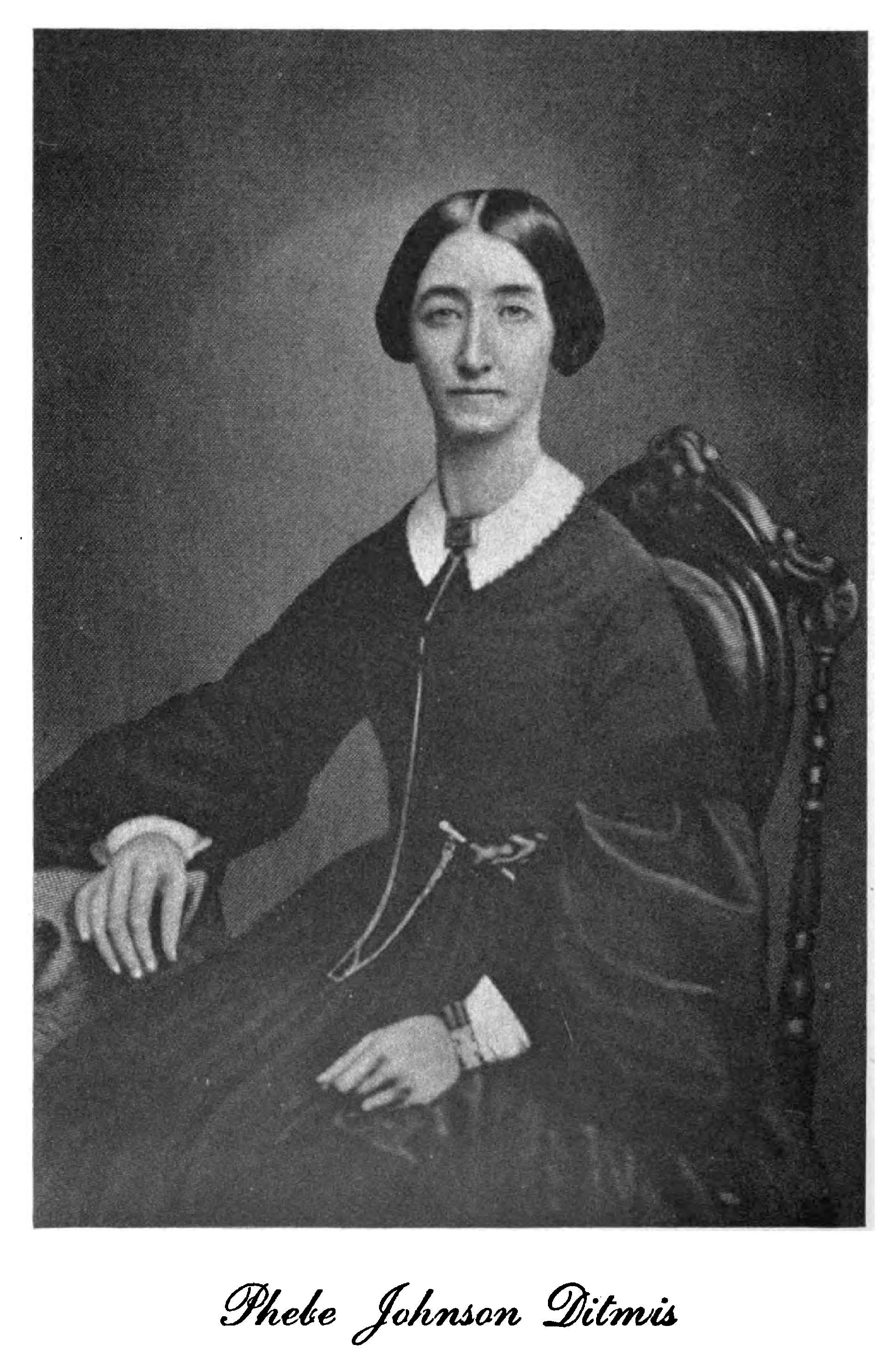
Phebe Johnson Ditmis (January 4, 1824–December 27, 1866) was the wife of Reformed Church of Queens pastor George Onderdonk Ditmis (July 22,1818–February 1, 1896).

Some members owned slaves, the most famous of the slaves being Sojourner Truth, and the church did not support abolitionism. In rural areas, ministers preached in Dutch until about 1830–1850, then switched to English, at the same time finally dropping the use of many traditional Dutch clothing and customs. Although some ministers favored revivals, generally the church did not support either the First or the Second Great Awakenings, which created much evangelical fervor.

Dutch language use faded thereafter until the new wave of Dutch immigration in the mid-19th century. This revived use of the language among Dutch descendants and in some churches.

==== Reformed Church women's work begins ====
In New York in January 1875 a group of women formed the Women’s Board of Foreign Missions. Women began organizing their North American Reformed Church Missions in 1882 and in 1909 became incorporated as the Women’s Board of Domestic Missions. Consecrated women began work among the American Indians in 1894, in 1900 an Appalachian settlement school in McKee, Kentucky (which eventually became called Annville Institute), and among Japanese residents in and around New York City in 1907.

==== Midwestern United States ====
Immigration from the Netherlands in the mid-19th century led to the expansion of the RCA into the Midwestern United States. In 1837, Pastor Abram D. Wilson and his wife Julia Evertson Wilson from New Jersey established the first Dutch Reformed church west of the Allegheny Mountains in Fairview, Illinois. Hope College and Western Theological Seminary were founded in Holland, Michigan, Central College in Pella, Iowa, and Northwestern College in Orange City, Iowa. In the 1857 Secession, a group of more conservative members in Michigan led by Gijsbert Haan separated from the RCA. They organized the Christian Reformed Church in North America (CRC), and other churches followed. In 1882 another group of congregations left for the CRC, mirroring developments in the church in the Netherlands.

=== Post-World War II ===
After 1945, the RCA expanded into Canada, which was the destination of a large group of Dutch emigrants. Between 1949 and 1958, the RCA opened 120 churches among non-Dutch suburban communities, appealing to mainline Protestants. It was a charter member of the Presbyterian Alliance, the Federal Council of Churches, and the World Council of Churches.

== Statistics ==
Like most other mainline denominations, the RCA has had a declining membership during the last thirty years. In 2024, the total membership was less than 84,000, down from 196,308 in 2018, from 220,000 in 2016, from 300,000 in 2000, and 360,000 in 1980.

== Beliefs ==
The RCA confesses several statements of doctrine and faith. These include the historic Apostles' Creed, Nicene Creed, and Athanasian Creed; the traditional Reformed Belgic Confession, the Heidelberg Catechism (with its compendium), the Canons of Dort.

At its 2010 meeting of the General Synod, the Church adopted the Belhar Confession as a fourth Standard of Unity (or confession; alongside the Belgic Confession, the Heidelberg Catechism, and the Canons of Dort).

=== Life issues ===
The RCA opposes euthanasia. The report of the Commission on Christian Action, issued in 1994, states, "What Christians say about issues of morality ought to be and usually is a reflection of their fundamental faith convictions. There are at least three of these convictions that appear especially relevant to the question of whether it is acceptable for Christians to seek a physician's assistance in committing suicide in the midst of extreme suffering./ A fundamental conviction Christians have is that they do not belong to themselves. Life, despite its circumstances, is a gift from God, and each individual is its steward... Contemporary arguments for the 'right' to assistance to commit suicide are based on ideas of each individual's autonomy over his or her life. Christians cannot claim such autonomy; Christians acknowledge that they belong to God... Christians yield their personal autonomy and accept a special obligation, as the first answer of the Heidelberg Catechism invites people to confess: 'I am not my own, but belong—body and soul, in life and in death—to my faithful Savior, Jesus Christ' (Heidelberg Catechism, Q&A 1)... A decision to take one's own life thus appears to be a denial that one belongs to God./ A second conviction is that God does not abandon people in times of suffering... Christians express their faith in God's love by trusting in God's care for them. A decision to end one's life would appear to be a cessation of that trust... Suffering calls upon people to trust God even in the valley of the shadow of death. It calls on people to let God, and not suffering, determine the agenda of their life and their death./ A third conviction is that in the community of God's people, caring for those who are dying is a burden Christians are willing to share. Both living and dying should occur within a caring community, and in the context of death, Christian discipleship takes the form of caring for those who are dying./ This is an era when many people find legislating morality a questionable practice. Should Christians promote legislation which embodies their conclusions about the morality of physician-assisted suicide?... If Christians are to be involved in debating laws regulating assisted suicide, it will be out of a concern for the health and well-being of society... As a society, there is no common understanding that gives any universal meaning to 'detrimental'. In humility, Christians can simply acknowledge this, and proceed...to share our own unique perspectives, inviting others to consider them and the faith that gives them meaning."

The Reformed Church also condemns the death penalty. The General Synod in 2000 expressed seven reasons why the Church opposes it:

- Capital punishment is incompatible with the Spirit of Christ and the ethic of love. The law of love does not negate justice, but it does nullify the motives of vengeance and retribution by forcing us to think in terms of redemption, rehabilitation, and reclamation. The Christ who refused to endorse the stoning of the woman taken in adultery would have us speak to the world of compassion, not vengeance.
- Capital punishment is of doubtful value as a deterrent. The capital punishment as a deterrent argument assumes a criminal will engage in a kind of rational, cost-benefit analysis before he or she commits murder. Most murders, however, are crimes of passion or are committed under the influence of drugs or alcohol. This does not excuse the perpetrator of responsibility for the crime, but it does show that in most cases capital punishment as a deterrent won't work.
- Capital punishment results in inequities of application. Numerous studies since 1965 have shown that racial factors play a significant role in determining whether or not a person receives a sentence of death.
- Capital punishment is a method open to irremediable mistakes. The increasing number of innocent defendants being found on death row is a clear sign that the process for sentencing people to death is fraught with fundamental errors—errors which cannot be remedied once an execution occurs.
- Capital punishment ignores corporate and community guilt. Such factors may diminish but certainly do not destroy the responsibility of the individual. Yet society also bears some responsibility for directing efforts and resources toward correcting those conditions that may foster such behavior.
- Capital punishment perpetuates the concepts of vengeance and retaliation. As an agency of society, the state should not become an avenger for individuals; it should not presume the authority to satisfy divine justice by vengeful methods.
- Capital punishment ignores the entire concept of rehabilitation. The Christian faith should be concerned not with retribution, but with redemption. Any method which closes the door to all forgiveness, and to any hope of redemption, cannot stand the test of our faith.

The General Synod resolution expressed its will "to urge members of the Reformed Church in America to contact their elected officials, urging them to advocate for the abolition of capital punishment and to call for an immediate moratorium on executions."

The RCA is generally opposed to abortion. The position of the General Synod, stated in 1973 and later affirmed, has been that "in principle" abortion "should not be practiced at all", but in a "complex society" of competing evils there "could be exceptions". However, abortion should never be chosen as a matter of "individual convenience". The church personnel should promote "Christian alternatives to abortion", and church members are asked to "support efforts for constitutional changes" to protect the unborn.

=== LGBTQ inclusion ===
Since 1978 the General Synod has made a number of statements on homosexuality. Homosexual acts are considered sinful and "contrary to the will of God". But homosexuals are not to be blamed for their condition. The church must affirm civil rights for homosexuals while it condemns homosexual behavior (1978). The church must seek to lift the homosexual's "burden of guilt", recognizing that homosexuality is a "complex phenomenon" (1979). The church should encourage "love and sensitivity towards such persons as fellow human beings" (1990). In 1994 the Synod condemned the humiliation and degradation of homosexuals and confessed that many members had not listened to the "heartfelt cries" of homosexual persons struggling for "self-acceptance and dignity."

In 2005, progressive churches founded the Room for All network for the inclusion of LGBTQ people.

While calling for compassion, patience, and loving support toward those who struggle with same-sex desires, the 2012 General Synod determined that it is a "disciplinable offense" to advocate for homosexual behavior or provide leadership for a service of a same-sex marriage. The following year, however, the General Synod essentially rescinded this statement and rebuked the 2012 delegates for demonstrating "a lack of decorum and civility," and usurping constitutional authority.

=== Marriage ===
In 2014, the General Synod recommended that the Commission on Church Order begin the process of defining marriage as heterosexual. However, in 2015, the General Synod approved a process for studying a way "to address the questions of human sexuality". Also in 2015, Hope College in Michigan, affiliated with the RCA, officially provided benefits to employees' same-sex spouses though the school continues to maintain a statement on sexuality that espouses a traditional definition of marriage.

Additionally, a number of congregations and classes have voted to publicly affirm LGBT members, including the Classis of New Brunswick and the Classis of Schenectady. Several of those congregations, including congregations dually affiliated with the RCA and United Church of Christ, perform same-sex marriages. There are RCA churches with gay pastors who have been ordained by other denominations. On 5 May 2017, the United Church of Christ and Reformed Church in America congregations that support LGBT inclusion announced the formation of an association for dually-affiliated congregations.

In April 2016, a working committee of the RCA developed a report on human sexuality. The report offers different options, for review by the General Synod, and includes the option to define marriage as between a man and woman or to define marriage as between two persons thus allowing same-gender marriages. Of these options, General Synod 2016 voted to define marriage as "man/woman". However, that vote needed to receive the support of 2/3 of the classes and be ratified again in 2017.

In March 2017, the proposal to define marriage as "man/woman" did not receive the necessary votes from 2/3 of the classes, and, as a result, it did not pass. On 12 June 2017, the General Synod voted for a "recommendation [which] says, 'faithful adherence to the RCA's Standards, therefore, entails the affirmation that marriage is between one man and one woman.'" Also, in 2017, a classis in the RCA ordained the first openly gay and married pastor who had declared himself as such when he began the ordination process.

In October 2021, the Church announced a restructuring in order to satisfy both conservative and progressive churches regarding same-sex marriage. Local classes and churches are allowed to choose their own stance on same-sex marriage.

In response, 43 dissatisfied conservative churches left the RCA in December 2021 and formed the Alliance of Reformed Churches.

Twelve churches formed the Reformation Canada Network, twelve from the Central Iowa classis formed The Sending Network and 5 formed the Kingdom Network.

Room for All brings together churches that support blessings of same-sex marriage.

=== Women's ordination ===
The RCA first admitted women to the offices of deacon and elder in 1972 and first ordained women in 1979. By 1980 the General Synod of the RCA amended the Book of Church Order (BCO) to clarify their position on women's ordination, including amending the language of Part I, Article 1, Section 3 of the BCO from "persons" to "men and women".

In 1980, the RCA added a conscience clause to the BCO stating, "If individual members of the classis find that their consciences, as illuminated by Scripture, would not permit them to participate in the licensure, ordination or installation of women as ministers of the Word, they shall not be required to participate in decisions or actions contrary to their consciences, but may not obstruct the classis in fulfilling its responsibility to arrange for the care, ordination, and installation of women candidates and ministers by means mutually agreed on by such women and the classis" (Part II, Article 2, Section 7).

In 2012, by a vote of 143 to 69, the General Synod of the RCA voted to remove the conscience clauses. However, the vote by the General Synod had to be approved by a majority of the classes (a classis serving the same function as a presbytery). Eventually, 31 classes voted in favor of removal, with 14 voting to retain them, and the vote was ratified at the RCA's 2013 General Synod.

== Polity ==
The RCA has a presbyterian polity where authority is divided among representative bodies: consistories, classes, regional synods, and the General Synod. The General Synod meets annually and is the representative body of the entire denomination, establishing its policies, programs, and agenda. Measures passed at General Synod are executed and overseen by the General Synod Council. Council members are appointed by the General Synod. A General Secretary oversees day-to-day operations. The Rev. Eddy Alemán, D. Min., was installed as the General Secretary at the 2018 General Synod.

The Constitution of the RCA consists of three parts: the Liturgy, the Government, and the Doctrinal Standards. The Government, along with the Formularies and the By-laws of the General Synod, are published annually in a volume known as The Book of Church Order.

== Colleges and seminaries ==
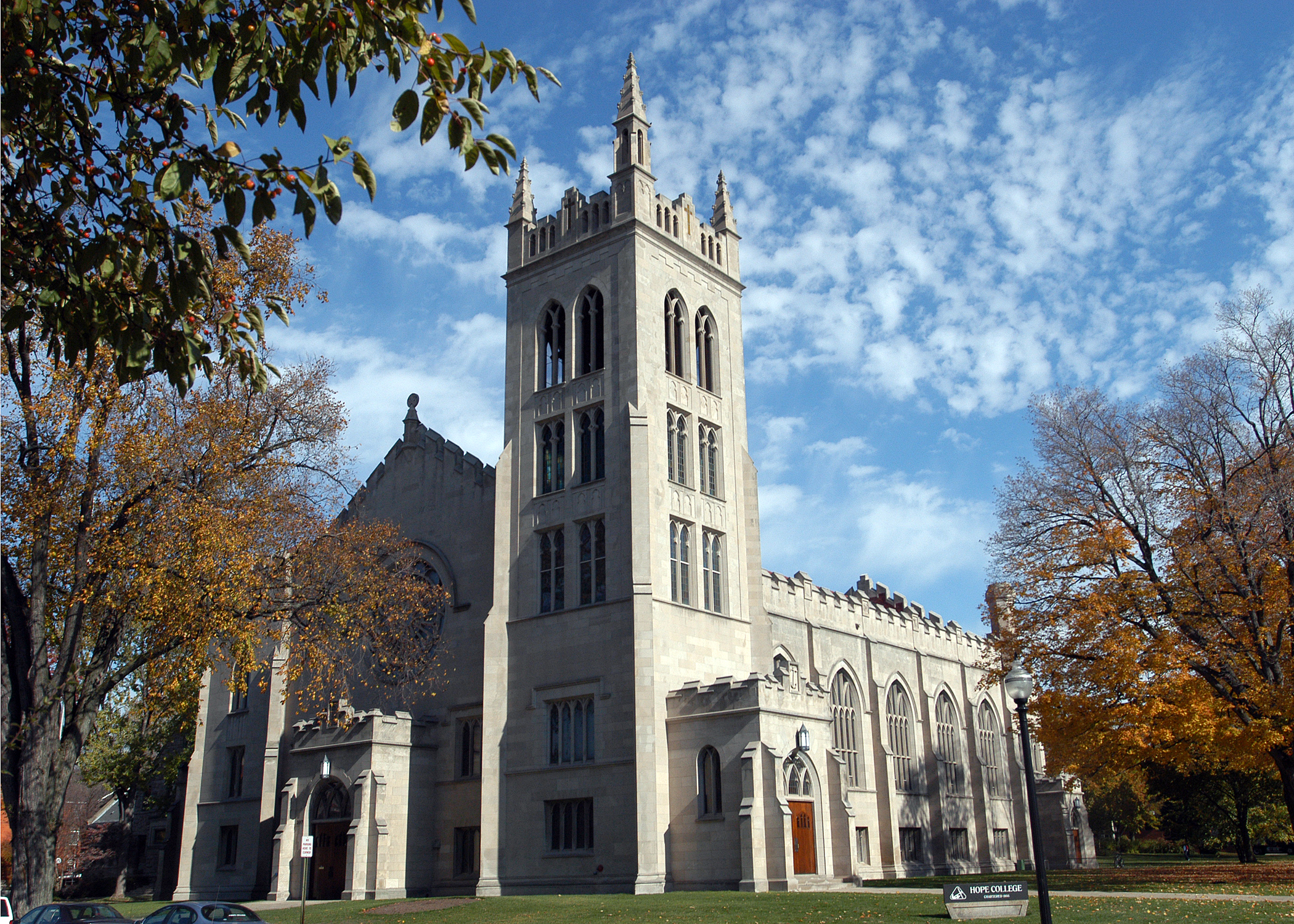
The Dimnent Chapel at Hope College in Holland, Michigan

Colleges

- Central College, Pella, Iowa
- Hope College, Holland, Michigan
- Northwestern College, Orange City, Iowa

Seminary

- New Brunswick Theological Seminary, New Brunswick, New Jersey

Officially Related Seminary

- Western Theological Seminary, Holland, Michigan

Certification agencies

- Students who do not attend or receive their Master of Divinity degree from one of the two seminaries operated by the RCA are certified and credentialed for ministry in the RCA through the Ministerial Formation Certification Agency in Paramount, California.

== Ecumenical relations ==
Through a document known as A Formula of Agreement, the RCA has full communion with the Presbyterian Church (U.S.A.), the United Church of Christ, and the Evangelical Lutheran Church in America. The relationship between the United Church of Christ and the RCA has been the subject of controversy within the RCA, particularly a resolution by the UCC General Synod in 2005 regarding homosexuality. The ELCA's affirmation of the ordination of homosexuals as clergy in 2009 prompted some RCA conservatives to call for a withdrawal from the Formula of Agreement. In 2012 RCA discussed its own position regarding homosexuality. The two denominations undertook a dialogue and in 1999 produced a document discussing their differences (PDF).

Along with their Formula of Agreement partners, the RCA retains close fellowship with the Christian Reformed Church in North America (CRC). In 2005 the RCA and CRC voted to allow for the exchange of ministers. Faith Alive Christian Resources, the CRC's publishing arm, is also used by the RCA and in 2013 published a joint hymnal for use in both denominations. The two denominations have also collaborated on various other ministry ventures, voted to merge pension plans in 2013 in conformity with the Affordable Care Act, and plan to hold back-to-back General Synods at Central College in Pella, Iowa, in 2014.

== Notable members ==
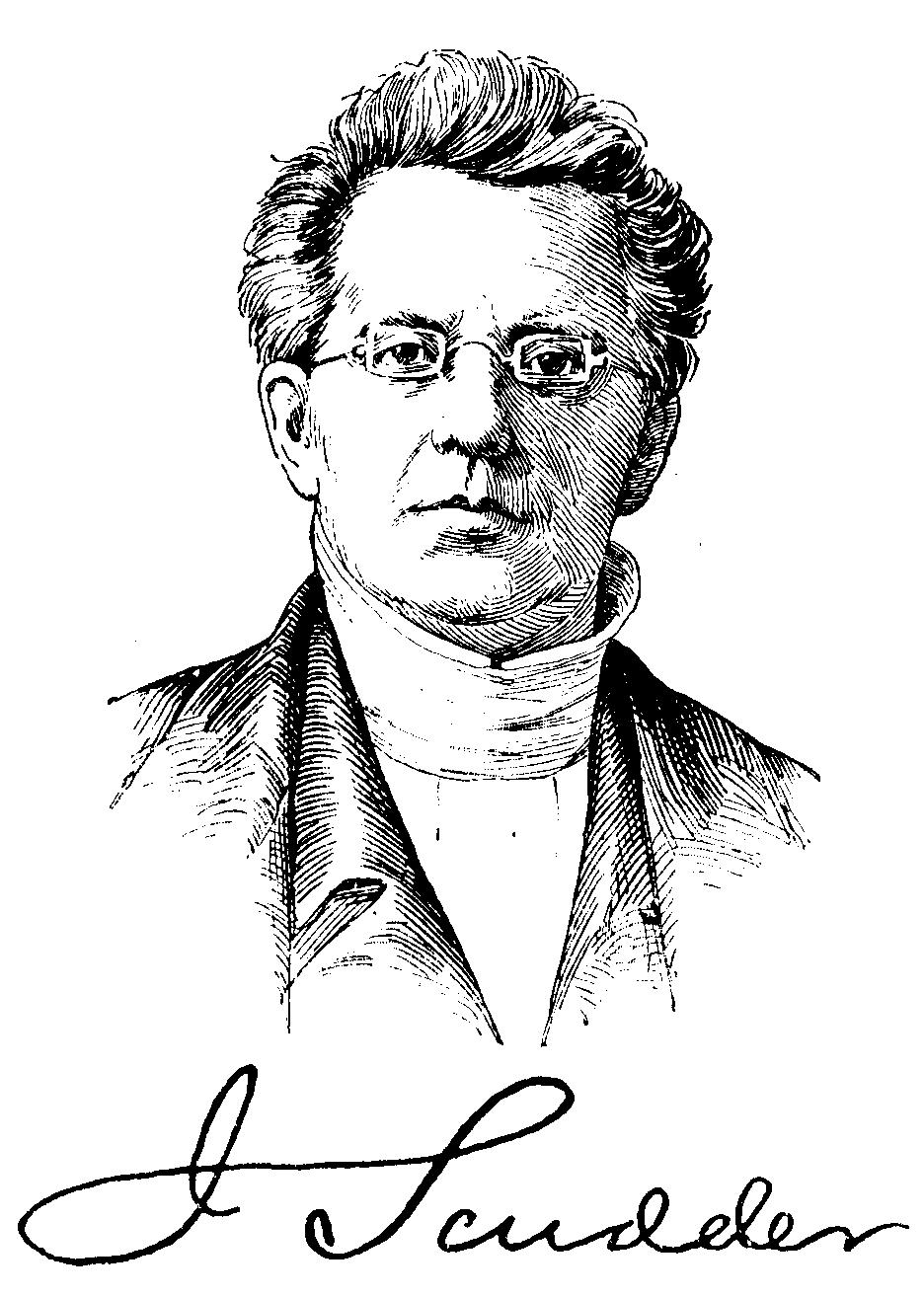
John Scudder Sr., a Dutch Reformed minister, started a family of missionaries in India in 1819

- James Osborne Arthur, missionary
- Edward Wilmot Blyden, educator, writer, diplomat and politician
- Vern Den Herder, professional football player, including with undefeated 1972 Miami Dolphins
- Everett Dirksen, senator
- B. D. Dykstra, writer and educator
- Geronimo
- Jack Hanna, American zoologist
- Peter Hoekstra, congressman
- Evel Knievel, motorcycle stuntman and daredevil
- Kyle Korver, professional basketball player in the NBA
- Francis D. "Hap" Moran, professional football player New York Giants, deacon and elder in the Reformed Church in America
- A. J. Muste, writer, professor, pacifist
- Jim Nantz, TV sportscaster
- Norman Vincent Peale, preacher and former pastor of U.S. president Donald Trump
- Louis P. Pojman, philosopher
- Clark V. Poling, one of the Four Chaplains
- Theodore Roosevelt, U.S. president
- Marge Roukema, Congresswoman, a convert from Roman Catholicism
- Albert Janse Ryckman, mayor of Albany, New York (1702–1703), captain of the Albany Militia, prominent Albany brewmaster, and deacon in the Dutch Reformed Church
- The Schuller Family – Robert Schuller, Robert A. Schuller, Bobby Schuller, all Reformed Church in America pastors
- John Scudder Sr., missionary in the Arcot Mission
- Philip Schuyler, a Patriot leader in the American Revolution
- Martin Van Buren, U.S. president
- Fez Whatley, radio personality
- Andrew Yang, entrepreneur and 2020 presidential candidate
- Edward Becenti, Navajo interpreter and son of Chief Judge Becenti (Navajo), translated Bible verses and songs into the Navajo language for the Christian Reformed Church in New Mexico

== See also ==
- American Reformed Mission
- Christian Reformed Church in North America
- List of Reformed denominations
