= Scudder =

Scudder, a surname, may refer to:

== People ==
- Bernard Scudder, translator from Icelandic to English
- Edward W. Scudder (1822-1893), Justice of the New Jersey Supreme Court
- Eliza Scudder (1821-1896), American hymnwriter
- Horace Scudder, American editor
- Henry Scudder (clergyman) (d. 1659?), English devotional writer
- Henry Martyn Scudder, American missionary and minister
- Ida S. Scudder, American missionary and physician
- Janet Scudder, American sculptor
- John Scudder, Sr., American medical missionary
- John Scudder (physician), American blood researcher
- John Milton Scudder, physician
- Laura Scudder, snack food developer
- Michael Y. Scudder, Circuit Judge of the United States Court of Appeals for the Seventh Circuit
- Richard Scudder, publisher, Newark Evening News
- Samuel Hubbard Scudder (1837–1911), American entomologist and paleontologist
- Scott Scudder, American baseball player
- Scudders in India, 42 members of 4 generations of a family devoted to Christian service
- Thayer Scudder, American social anthropologist
- Vida Dutton Scudder, Indian-born American educator, writer, and welfare activist

=== Members of the United States Congress ===
- Henry Joel Scudder, United States Representative from New York
- Hubert Baxter Scudder, U.S. Representative from California
- John Anderson Scudder, U.S. Representative from New Jersey
- Nathaniel Scudder, physician and member of the Continental Congress
- Isaac Williamson Scudder, U.S. Representative from New Jersey
- Townsend Scudder, U.S. Representative from New York
- Tredwell Scudder, U.S. Representative from New York
- Zeno Scudder, U.S. Representative from Massachusetts

== Fictional ==
- Alec Scudder, a character in Maurice (novel) and Maurice (1987 film)
- Bertram Scudder, a character in Atlas Shrugged
- Franklin P. Scudder, a character found murdered in the book, The Thirty-Nine Steps by John Buchan
- Henry Scudder, a character in the HBO drama series Carnivàle
- Matthew Scudder, a fictional private detective
- Nehemiah Scudder, a.k.a. "The First Prophet", a background character in Robert A. Heinlein's Future History.
- Sam Scudder, a.k.a. “Mirror Master”, a foe of the DC Comics superhero the Flash.

Scudder may also refer to:

- DWS Scudder (formerly Scudder, Stevens & Clark), the asset management subsidiary of Deutsche Bank
