= John Scudder =

John Scudder may refer to:

- John Scudder (builder) (1815–1869), American builder
- John Scudder (physician) (1889–1971), American physician and blood specialist
- John Scudder Sr. (1793–1855), American medical missionary to India
- John A. Scudder (1759–1836), American politician
- John Milton Scudder (1829–1894), American eclectic medicine physician
