= Arcot Mission =

The Arcot Mission of the Reformed Church in America was located in Arcot, Tamil Nadu, India. The mission was founded by the Scudder family including John Scudder Sr. (1793–1855) in 1851 in order to practice Christian charity by providing medical services. Through to the Indian Independence period, the Arcot mission was known for its medical care as well as giving good quality education to the oppressed communities in India.

== Background ==
In 1819, John and Harriet Scudder arrived in India to start a missionary post there. Many years later in April 1846, the Scudders were asked to go to work at the newly established Madura Mission of the American Board. At the time, there was a cholera epidemic and the Scudders were the only physicians available. Their work was the start of the Arcot Mission of the Reformed Church. In 1851, the Arcot mission was approved for establishment and it was organized in 1853. From 1853 until 1857 the mission was administered by the ABCFM. Henry Martyn Scudder, the eldest son of the Scudders, established the mission along with two of his brothers. He and his wife moved to the North Arcot District and started a dispensary to both help the people and also to win their favor. The mission was a test to see missionary posts could be created and run by members of the same family. If it worked or failed, it would set a precedent for other missionaries.

== Mission ==
At one time the mission included 16 missionaries, 460 Indian agents, 114 non-Christian teachers, 2,305 communicants, and 10,060 Christians. The mission had multiple fundamentals to its existence including, "The preaching of the Gospel", "The preparation and extensive diffusion of Vernacular Tracts and Books", and "The education of those who join us". The missionary must preach to everyone in order to have the masses convert to Christianity. Arcot must also fuse both the Christian views with the Hindus.

== Issues in the Missionary ==
A major issue, specific to India was the caste system. When people converted to Christianity they refused to give up their caste, especially if they were in a high caste. There were so many issues that in order to resolve this issue they set guidelines for people wishing to convert. This included that people needed to renounce the use of castes forever and the person had to renounce their caste again before they went to Communion (Page 34 of From Mission to Church). These rules became one of the utmost important policies of the Arcot Mission and were strictly followed.

== Women's Roles in the Missionary ==
When the Arcot Mission was founded, women were not able to be missionaries. Therefore, the founding member of the mission are only men. Officially, Henry Martyn Scudder, William Waterbury Scudder, and Joseph Scudder are the founding members of the missionary. Their wives, however, played equally important role in the founding.

== Legacy ==
"The mission built up an indigenous church in which the Indians had full membership and equality. Francis Clark, president of Christian Endeavor, visited Arcot. By 1950, the mission claimed to have 35,000 converted Indians. With its independence granted in 1947, India put restraints on missionary activities. The collection consists of books, booklets, brochures, magazine articles, maps, pamphlets, and reports."
