= Harriet E. Clark =

American teacher and author

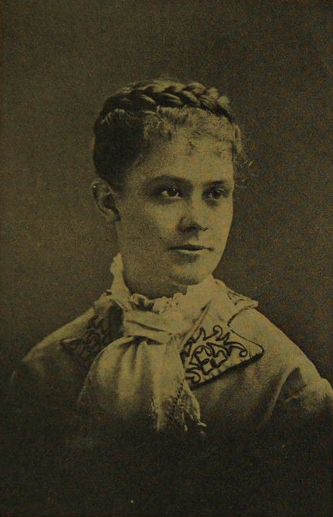
- (1876)
- Born: Harriet Elizabeth Abbott; December 10, 1850; Hampton Falls, New Hampshire, U.S.
- Died: September 24, 1945 (aged 94); Newton, Massachusetts, U.S.
- Resting place: Newton Cemetery
- Occupations: Teacher; author
- Spouse: Francis Edward Clark (m. 1876; died 1927)
- Children: 5
- Relatives: John Alden
- Writing career
- Pen name: Mrs. Francis E. Clark
- Genres: Religion; travel

Harriet E. Clark (née, Abbott; pen name, Mrs. Francis E. Clark; December 10, 1850 – September 24, 1945) was an American teacher and author. She was the founder of the "Mizpah Circle", a group of girls who studied about and prayed for missionaries. She also originated the idea of the Society of Christian Endeavor.

== Early life and education ==
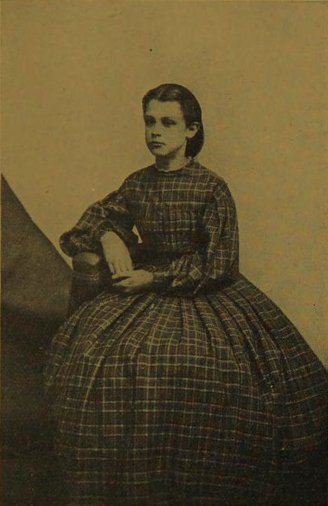
age 13

Harriet Elizabeth Abbott was born December 10, 1850, a native of Hampton Falls, New Hampshire. Her parents were Rev. Sereno T. and Sarah (French) Abbott. Her grandfather and great-grandfather were clergymen also. She was a direct descendent of John Alden and Priscilla Mullens.

After Harriet's father died, in 1855, the family removed to Andover, Massachusetts, where she received her education.

== Career ==
She went on to become a schoolteacher in Andover, and also taught for a year in the grammar school at Ballardvale, Massachusetts. At Abbott Village Mission School, she taught the primary class and played the cabinet organ. Here, she met another teacher, Dr. Rev. Francis Edward Clark, and in 1876, they married.

In the following year, she organized the "Mizpah Circle", the first "Junior Society", though not yet of "Christian Endeavor". The Mizpah Circle was a missionary society. It consisted of a group of girls who studied about and prayed for missionaries. Clark's love of children was especially noticeable in her travels to China, Japan, and India. The stained-glass window in the front of the Williston Church in Portland, Maine is a memorial to the Mizpah Circle. Under Clark's leadership, the Mizpah Circle also raised money for the "Book of Psalms", which was used in the responsive service of the church. These responsive readings were found one Sunday morning in the pews as a symbol of youthful contribution to the worship.

Clark, an effective speaker, is credited with having originated the Christian Endeavor idea, and the movement's success was largely due to her. As Dr. Clark made his trips to foreign countries around the world, Mrs. Clark assisted him in furthering the main object of his journeys: Christian Endeavor work. She made frequent addresses, especially before gatherings of pastors' wives and missionaries, to whom she explained the work.

She uprooted every year or two that she might accompany Dr. Clark worldwide. A frequent sufferer from seasickness, she probably traveled more miles by water than any other woman from the U.S., earning the title, "Mother Endeavor Clark". She traveled not only by steamship and railway, but also thousands of miles by carriage and bullock cart, on the back of horses, mules, donkeys, camels, and elephants, in sedan chairs, rickshaws, wheelbarrows, and on foot, to keep their Christian Endeavor appointments in the out-of-the-way places of the world. In all these journeyings, she carried her portable typewriter and assisted Dr. Clark in his literary labors, collaborating with him in Our Journey around the World, the story of their first trip.

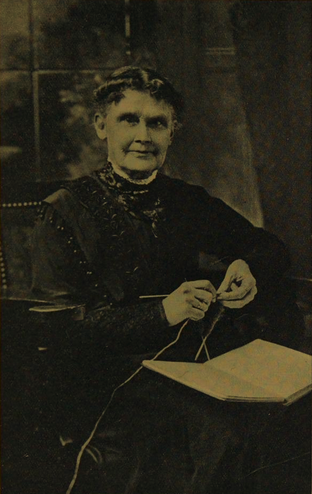
1920

Clark was a favorite at missionary gatherings. When at home, she was for many years the superintendent of the Junior society in her home church at Auburndale, Massachusetts, and also conducted the department for Junior superintendents in The Christian Endeavor World. Since 1915, she was a member of the Boston Authors Club.

== Personal life ==
On October 3, 1876, in Andover, she married Dr. Rev. Francis Edward Clark. (Note: According to Familysearch.org, the wedding took place on October 2, 1876.) They went on to have five children.

- Maude Williston Clarke (1877–1961)
- Eugene Francis Clark (1879–1930)
- Faith P. Clark (1883–1883)
- Prof. Harold Symmes Clark (1887–1985)
- Sydney Aylmer Clark (1890–1975)

Harriet E. Clark died in Newton, Massachusetts, September 24, 1945, and was buried at Newton Cemetery.

== Selected works ==
Our journey around the world (1894)

Junior endeavor (1903)

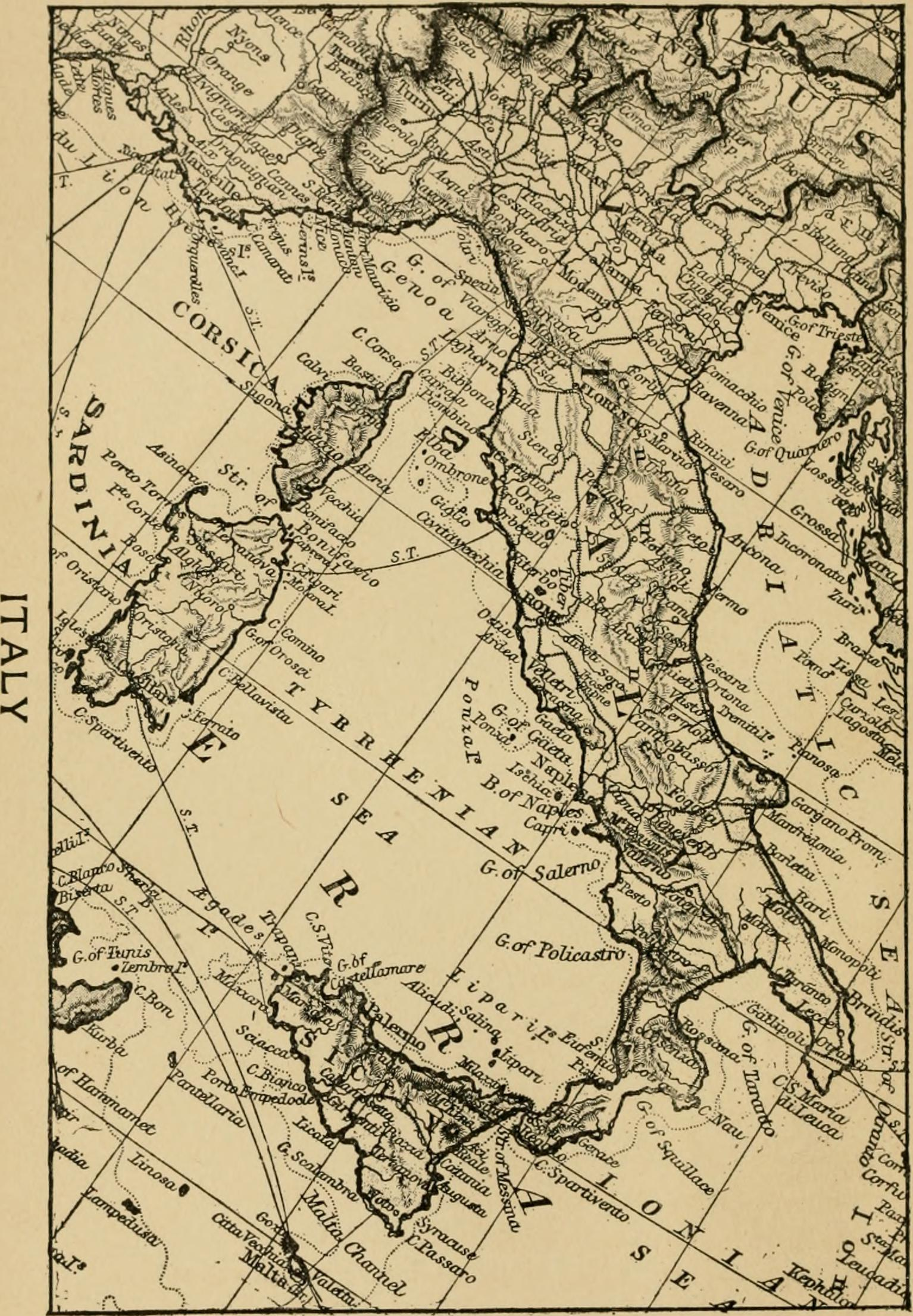
The gospel in Latin lands (1909)

Bible autobiographies (1921)

- A daily message for Christian endeavorers : a book for the quiet hour, for the prayer meeting, and for the birthday (1897) (text)
- Junior endeavor in theory and practice (1903) (text)
- Our immigrants at Ellis Island; an exercise prepared for the young people and descriptive of the reception, inspection, and experiences of our immigrants in the detention-room and railway offices (1912) (text)
- Bible autobiographies and other Bible stories (1921) (preface by Francis E. Clark) (text)
- Outlines in professional reading (193?)
- The little girl that once was I (autobiography; 1936)

=== With Francis E. Clark ===
- Our Journey Around the World, with Glimpses of Life in Far Off Lands as Seen Through a Woman's Eyes (1894) (with Francis E. Clark) (text)
- The Gospel in Latin Lands: Outline Studies of Protestant Work in the Latin (1909) (text)
