= Rev. Francis E. Clark House =

Historic house in Massachusetts, United States

- Clark House
- U.S. National Register of Historic Places
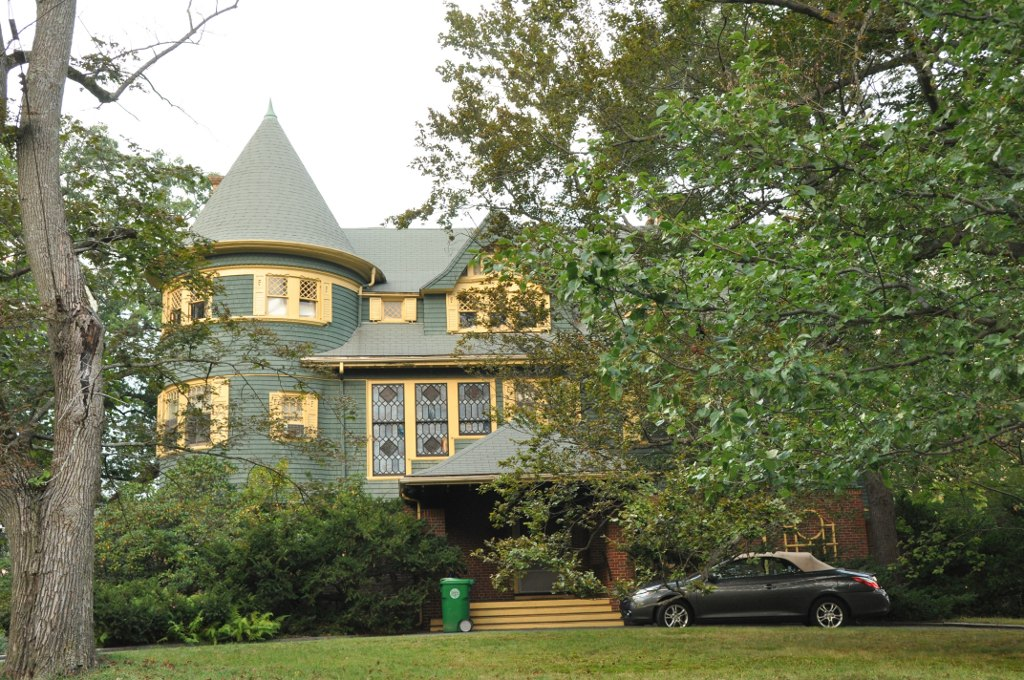

- Location within Massachusetts Location within the United States
- Location: 379 Central St., Newton, Massachusetts
- Coordinates: 42°20′28.8″N 71°15′17.7″W
- Built: 1895
- Architectural style: Shingle Style
- MPS: Newton MRA
- NRHP reference No.: 86001785
- Added to NRHP: September 04, 1986

The Clark House, also known as the Rev. Francis E. Clark House, is an historic house at located at 379 Central Street in the village of Auburndale in Newton, Massachusetts. It is a 2 1/2-story wood-frame structure, with a cross-gable configuration that has a large circular three-story tower at the corner, topped by a conical roof. It has a variety of gables, projections, and window shapes and placement, characteristics of the Queen Anne style of architecture. It was built in 1895 for Rev. Francis Edward Clark, founder of the Young People's Society of Christian Endeavour. On September 4, 1986, the house was added to the National Register of Historic Places.

== See also ==
- National Register of Historic Places listings in Newton, Massachusetts
