= Samuel H. Kellogg =

Presbyterian missionary in India

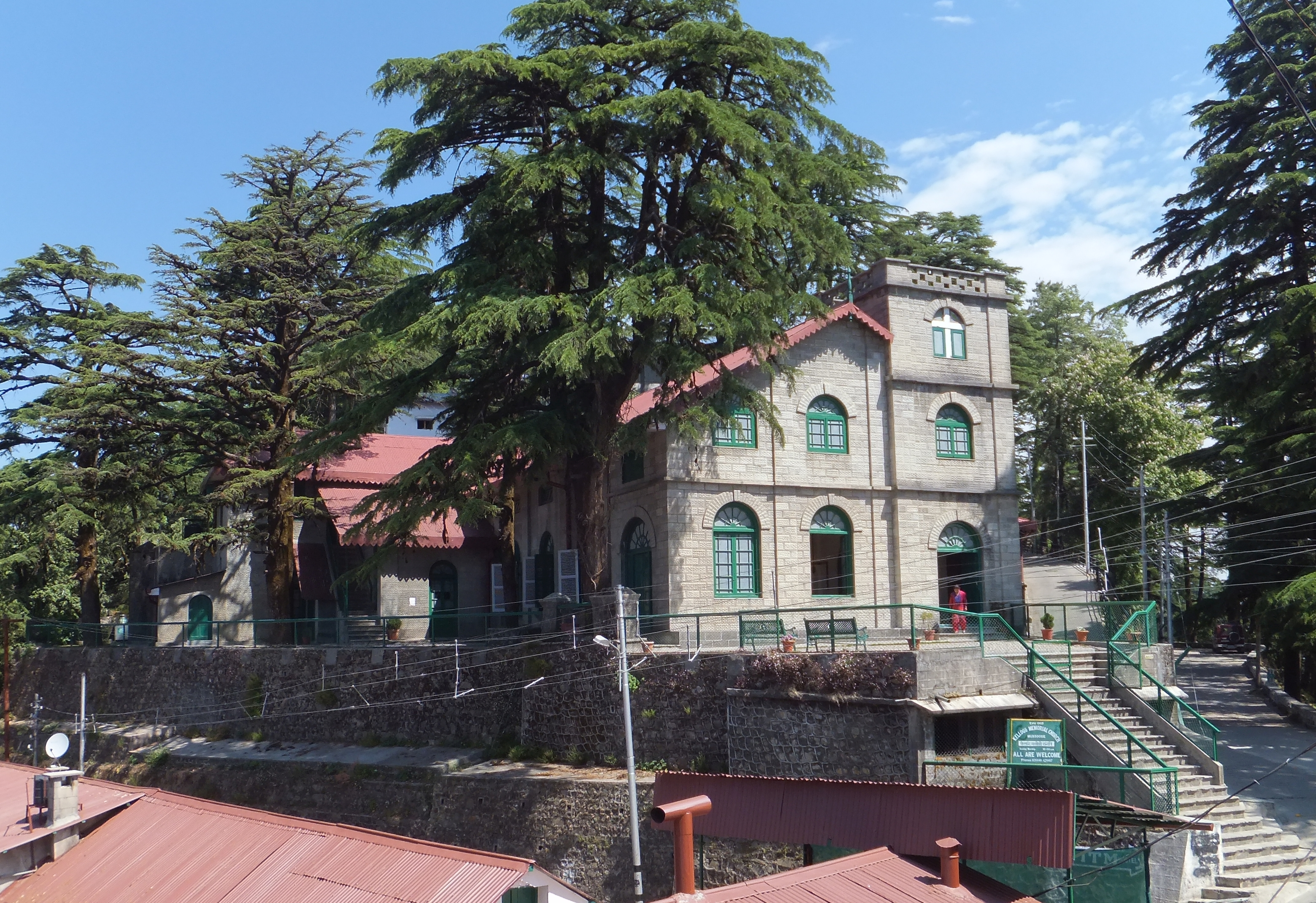
Kellogg Memorial Church in Landour

Dr Samuel Henry Kellogg (6 September 1839 - 3 May 1899) was an American Presbyterian missionary in India who played the major role in revising and retranslating the Hindi Bible. His colleagues in the translation were William Hooper and Joseph Arthur Lambert.

Kellogg was one of the leading advocates of the change in American Evangelical theology from postmillennialism to premillennialism between 1870 and 1910.

== Life ==
Kellogg was born in Long Island, the son of the Rev. Samuel Kellogg, a Presbyterian minister and Mary P. Henry Kellogg.

Kellogg graduated from Princeton College in 1861; after graduation, he heard Rev. Henry Martyn Scudder talking about his missionary experience in India and the need for missionaries there. He decided to become a missionary and in 1864, he and his wife, Antoinette Hartwell, sailed for India where they lived and worked at Farrukhabad Mission, Calcutta.

After Antoinette's death in 1876, he returned to North America with his four children and worked for the Presbyterian Church of Canada and the Theological Seminary in Allegheny. In 1879, he married Sara Constance Macrum.

During this time, his book of Hindi grammar was published and the Council of the British Government's Secretary of State for India prescribed the book as an authority to be studied by all candidates for the India Civil Service as were required to pass examinations in the Hindi language.

In 1892 he, Sara and their children travelled to Ahmedabad to retranslate the Hindi Bible.

He died in Uttarakhand, India.

== Publications ==
Kellogg wrote a number of books including;

- The Jews: or, Prediction and Fulfilment: An Argument for the Times (London: J. Nisbet and Co., c. 1883)
- The Light of Asia and the Light of the World (1885)
- The Book of Leviticus (Hodder and Stoughton., 1891)
- Genesis and Growth of Religion (1892)
- A Grammar of the Hindi Language (London : Kegan Paul, Trench, Trübner, and Co., 1893., 1893)
- A Handbook of Comparative Religion (Philadelphia : The Westminister press, (1899)
- The Genesis and Growth of Religion
- The Past a Prophecy of the Future: And Other Sermons
