= Sydney A. Clark =

American travel writer

Sydney A. Clark (1891–1975) was an American travel writer.

== Biography ==
Born in Auburndale, Massachusetts, Clark graduated from Dartmouth College in 1912. Afterward, he taught at The Hill School in Pottstown, Pennsylvania, and the Country Day School in Kansas City, Missouri. He later worked for a Boston-based real estate firm before transitioning to full-time travel writing.

Clark's international travels began at age 6, accompanying his father, Francis Edward Clark, founder of the Christian Endeavor movement. By 15, he had visited Europe multiple times. At 24, he co-authored a volume on Scandinavia with his father. It wasn't until age 40 that he pursued travel writing as his primary occupation.

Among his published works were the Fifty Dollar series, which provided guidance on touring various countries on a budget of $50 per person (based on prewar economics). His post-war series, All the Best in..., was noted for its detailed information and clear style.

Clark died in 1975 from a heart attack while driving in Sagamore Beach, Massachusetts. At the time of his death, he was working on an autobiography titled Around the World in 80 Years.

== Bibliography ==
- Fifty Dollars series
  - England on Fifty Dollars (1934)
  - Sweden on Fifty Dollars (1936)
- All the Best in... series
- Golden Tapestry of California (1937)
