= Williston-West Church and Parish House =

Historic church in Maine, United States

- U.S. National Register of Historic Places
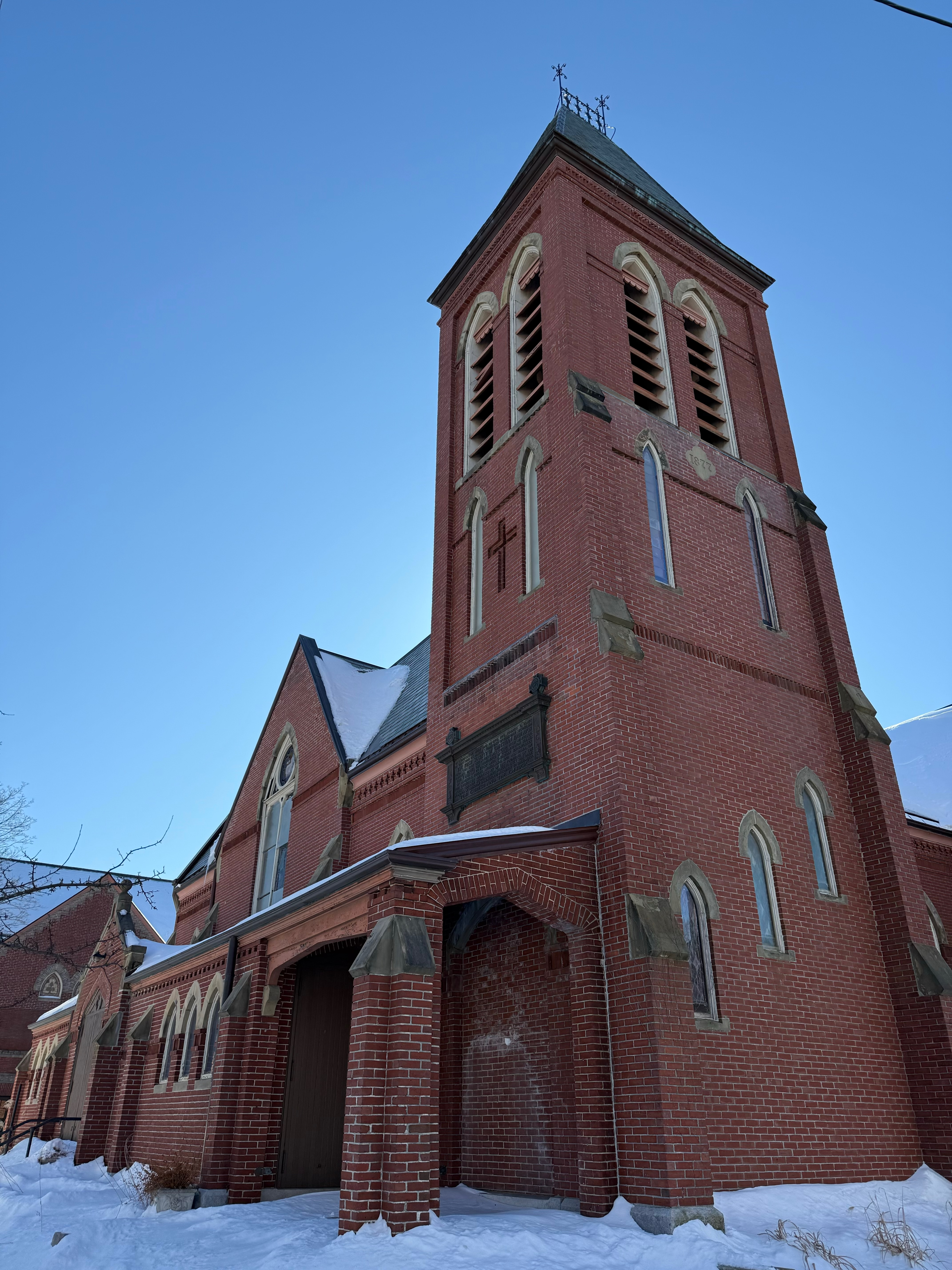
- The building in 2025

- Location within Maine Location within the United States
- Location: 32 Thomas Street, Portland, Maine
- Coordinates: 43°38′52″N 70°16′16″W
- Area: 0.5 acres (0.20 ha)
- Built: 1897; 129 years ago
- Architect: Francis H. Fassett (church), John Calvin Stevens (parish house)
- Architectural style: Gothic
- NRHP reference No.: 80000232
- Added to NRHP: June 22, 1980

The Williston-West Church and Parish House are a historic church and house at 32 Thomas Street in the West End neighborhood of Portland, Maine, United States. The church was built in 1897, and is a significant Gothic work by Francis H. Fassett. The parish house, built in 1905, was designed by father-and-son duo John Calvin Stevens and John Howard Stevens. The church is historically notable as the founding site of Christian Endeavor International, considered a major forerunner of modern youth ministries. The property was listed on the National Register of Historic Places in 1980. The church congregation merged with another in 2011, and the property was sold for rehabilitation and redevelopment. It now houses professional offices.

== Description and history ==
The Williston-West Church and Parish House stand in Portland's West End, on the west side of Thomas Street, occupying the north half of the block between Carroll and Clifford Streets. The church, standing at the corner of Carroll and Thomas, is a somewhat irregularly shaped complex, dominated by a square three-story tower at the street corner. The walls are buttressed, and lined with Gothic-arched windows, with a large rose window in the main facade. Separated from the church by a courtyard to its south is the parish house, a two-story brick building of compatible style.

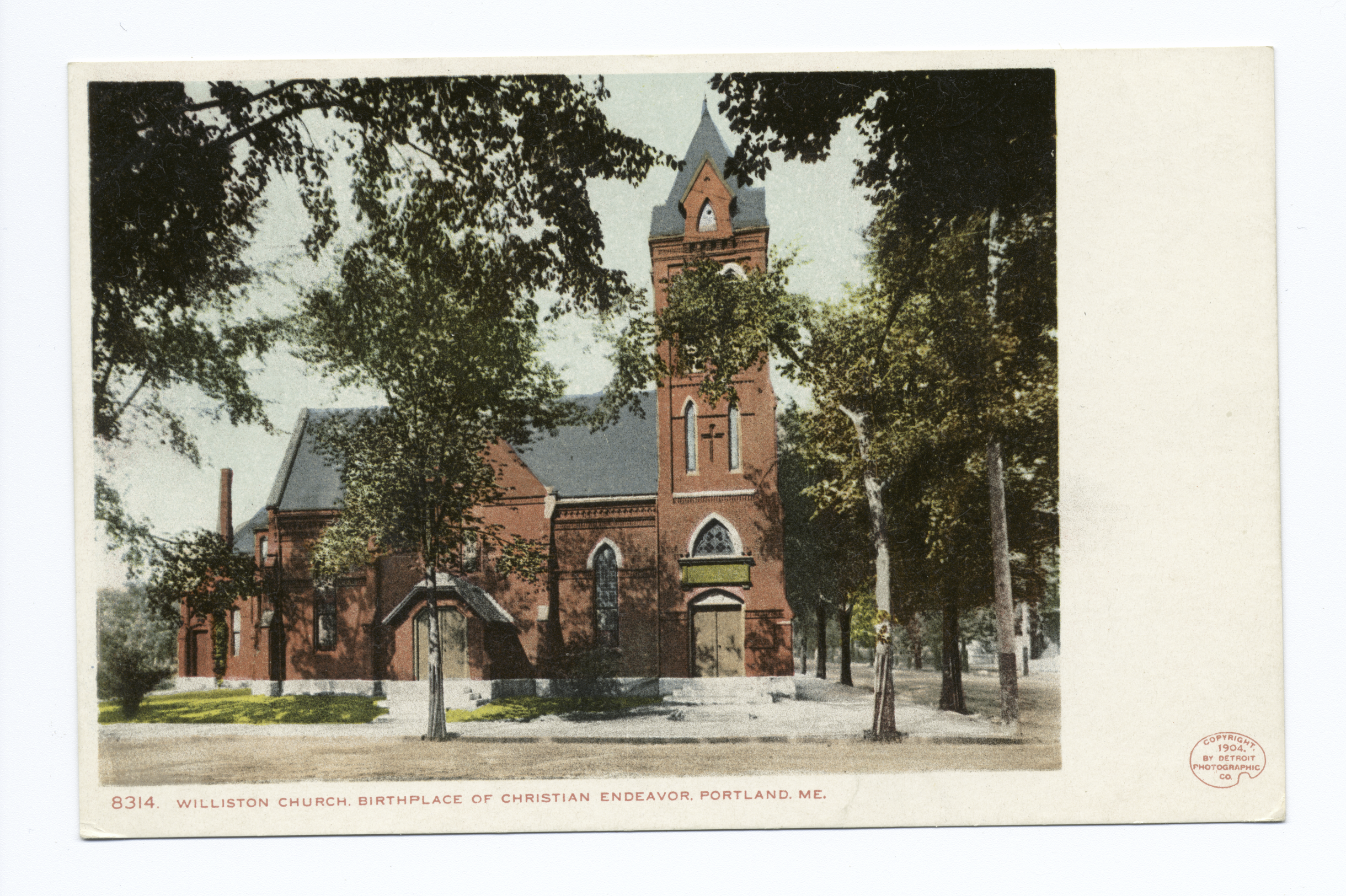
Early 20th century postcard

The church complex is unusual for containing works separated in time by two of the city's most prominent architects. Francis H. Fassett was the city's leading architect in the mid-19th century, and mentored John Calvin Stevens in his early years. The church is also of historical note, for it was here that Francis Edward Clark established Christian Endeavor, a non-denominational youth ministry that is now international in its scope.

With its congregation declining in size, the Williston-West Church was merged in 2011 with the Immanuel Baptist-American Baptist Churches to form the Williston-Immanuel Church, which meets in a church on High Street. The church property was then sold to a developer. In 2014, the property was involved in a rezoning lawsuit in which the City of Portland prevailed in the state supreme court.

== See also ==
- National Register of Historic Places listings in Portland, Maine
