= Charles R. Drew =

American surgeon and medical researcher (1904–1950)

Charles Drew
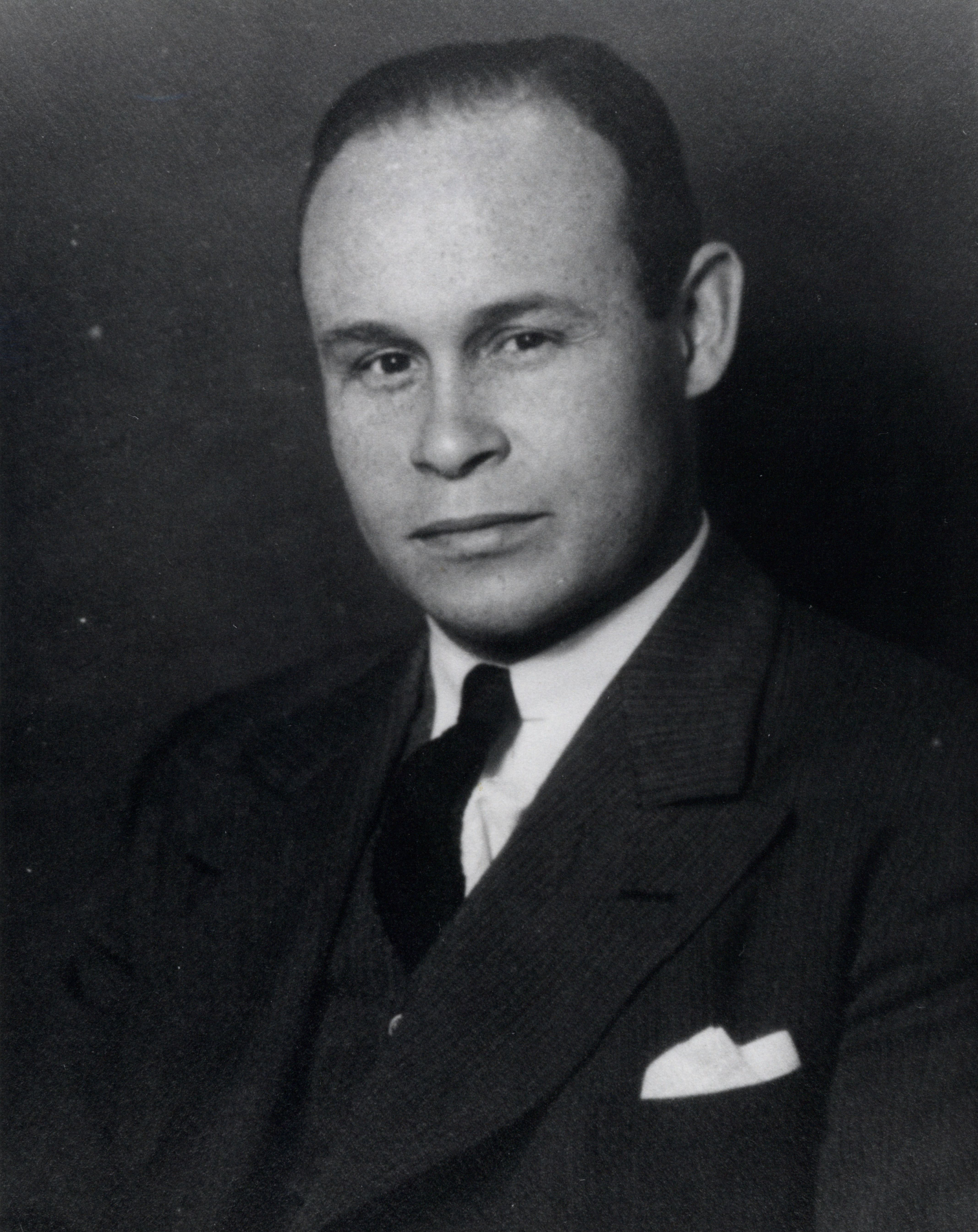
- Drew, c. 1949
- Born: Charles Richard Drew; June 3, 1904; Washington, D.C., U.S.
- Died: April 1, 1950 (aged 45); Burlington, North Carolina, U.S.
- Education: Amherst College (BS); McGill University (ChM, MD); Columbia University (ScD)
- Relatives: Charlene (daughter)
- Awards: Spingarn Medal (1944)
- Scientific career
- Fields: General surgery
- Workplaces: Freedman's Hospital; Morgan State University; Montreal General Hospital; Howard University
- Doctoral advisor: John Beattie

Charles Richard Drew (June 3, 1904 – April 1, 1950) was an American surgeon and medical researcher. He researched in the field of blood transfusions, developing improved techniques for blood storage, and applied his expert knowledge to developing large-scale blood banks early in World War II. This allowed medics to save thousands of Allied forces' lives during the war. As the most prominent African American in the field, Drew protested against the practice of racial segregation in the donation of blood, as it lacked scientific foundation, and resigned his position with the American Red Cross, which maintained the policy until 1950.

== Early life and education ==
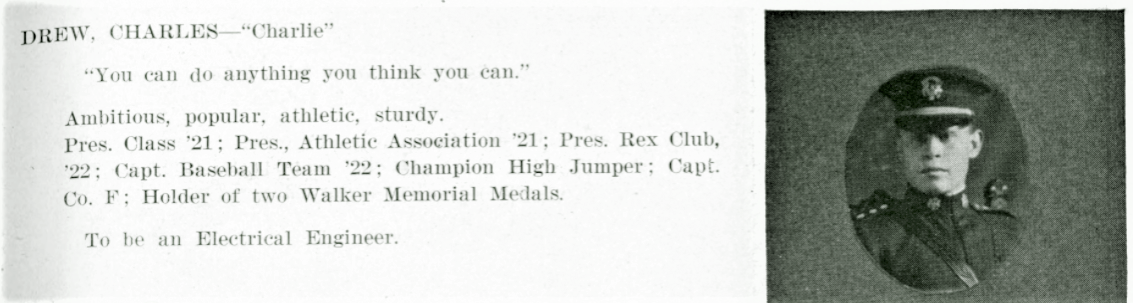
Drew in the Dunbar High School yearbook, 1922

Drew was born in 1904 into an African-American middle-class family in Washington, D.C. His father, Richard, was a carpet layer, and his mother, Nora Burrell, trained as a teacher. Drew and three (two sisters, one brother) of his four younger siblings (three sisters and one brother) grew up in Washington's largely middle-class and interracial Foggy Bottom neighborhood. From a young age Drew began work as a paperboy in his neighborhood, daily helping deliver over a thousand newspapers to his neighbors. Drew attended Washington's Dunbar High School which was well-known for its equality and opportunities for all, despite the racial climate at the time. From 1920 until his marriage in 1939, Drew's permanent address was in Arlington County, Virginia, although he graduated from Washington's Dunbar High School in 1922 and resided elsewhere during that period of time.

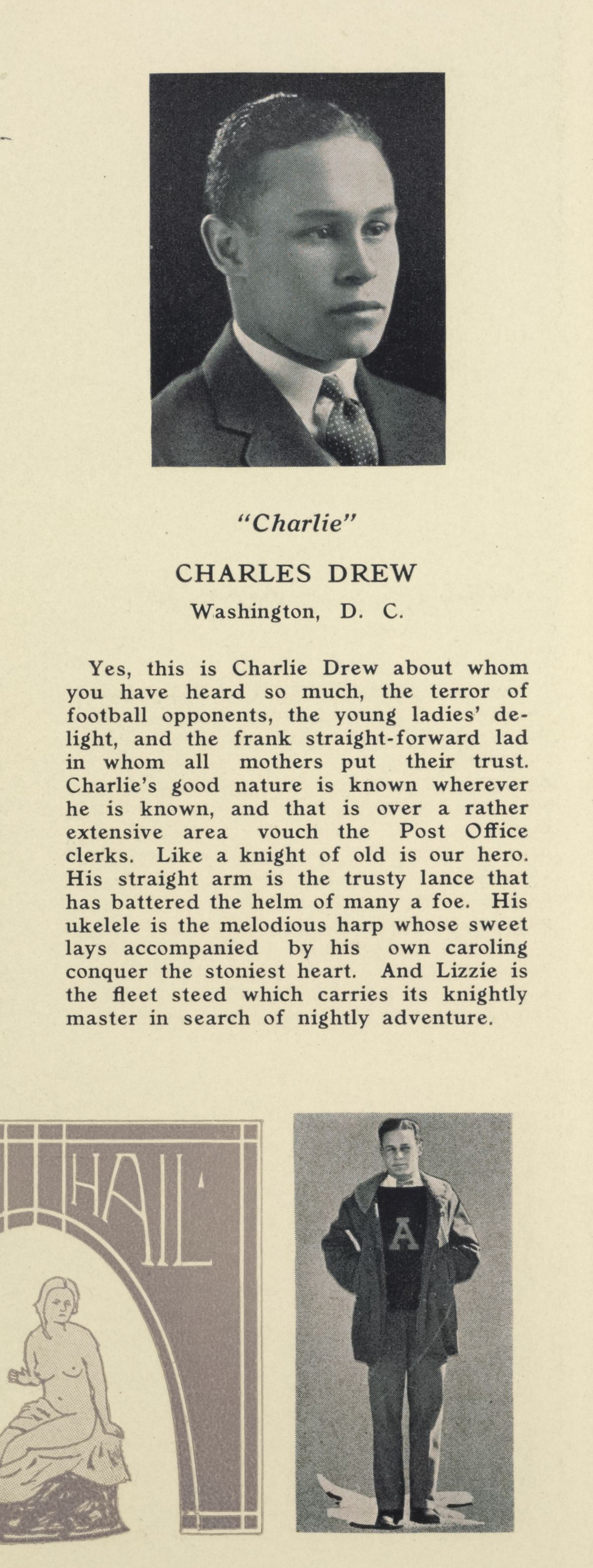
Drew in the Amherst College yearbook, 1926

Drew won an athletics scholarship to Amherst College in Massachusetts, where he played on the football as well as the track and field teams, and graduated in 1926. After college, Drew spent two years (1926–1928) as a professor of chemistry and biology, the first athletic director, and a football coach at the historically black private Morgan College in Baltimore, Maryland, to earn the money to pay for medical school.

For his medical career Drew applied to Howard University, Harvard Medical School, and later McGill University. Drew lacked some prerequisites for Howard University, and Harvard wanted to defer him a year, so to begin medical school promptly, Drew decided to attend McGill's medical school in Montreal, Canada.

It was during this stage in his medical journey that Drew worked with John Beattie, who was conducting research regarding the potential correlations between blood transfusions and shock therapy. Shock occurs as the amount of blood in the body rapidly declines which can be due to a variety of factors such as a wound or dehydration. As the body goes into shock, both blood pressure and body temperature decrease which then causes a lack of blood flow and a loss of oxygen in the body's tissues and cells. Eventually, it became clear that transfusions were the solution to treating victims of shock, but at the time there was no successful method of transportation or mass storage of blood, leaving transfusions to be extremely limited to location.

At McGill, he achieved membership in Alpha Omega Alpha, a scholastic honor society for medical students; ranked second in his graduating class of 127 students; and received the Doctor of Medicine and Master of Surgery degree awarded by the McGill University Faculty of Medicine in 1933.

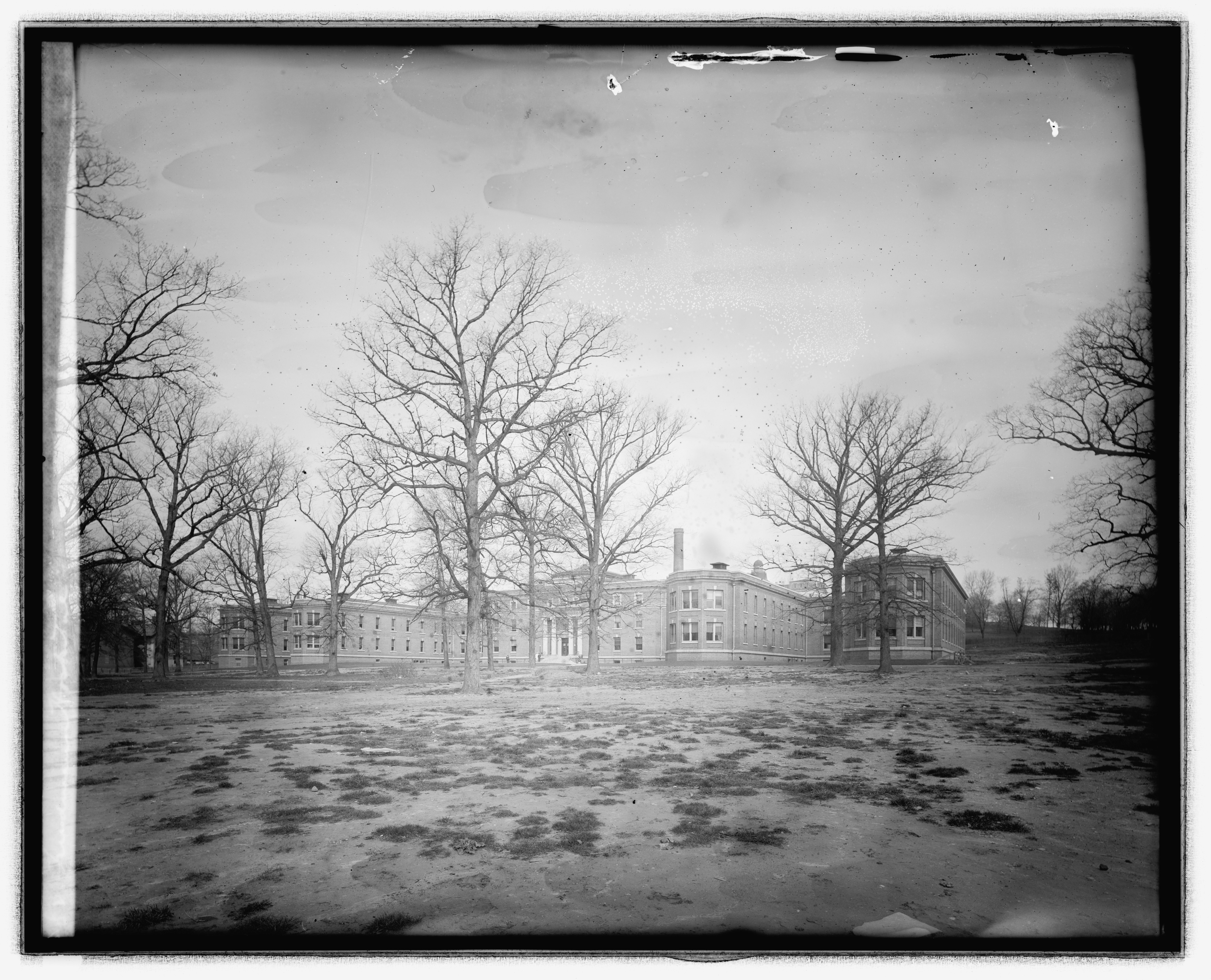
Freedman's Hospital between 1910 and 1935

Drew's first appointment as a faculty instructor was for pathology at Howard University from 1935 to 1936. He then joined Freedman's Hospital, a federally operated facility associated with Howard University, as an instructor in surgery and an assistant surgeon. In 1938, Drew began graduate work at Columbia University in New York City on the award of a two-year Rockefeller Fellowship in surgery. He then began postgraduate work, earning his Doctor of Science in Surgery at Columbia University. He spent time doing research at Columbia's Presbyterian Hospital and wrote a doctoral thesis, Banked Blood: A Study on Blood Preservation, based on an exhaustive study of blood preservation techniques. It was through this blood preservation research that Drew realized blood plasma was able to be preserved two months longer through de-liquification, or the separation of liquid blood from the cells. When ready for use the plasma would then be able to return to its original state via reconstitution. This thesis earned him his Doctor of Science in Medicine degree in 1940, becoming the first African American to receive one. The District of Columbia chapter of the American Medical Association allowed only white doctors to join, so "Drew died without ever being accepted for membership in the AMA."

== Blood for Britain ==
In late 1940, before the U.S. entered World War II and just after earning his doctorate, Drew was recruited by John Scudder to help set up and administer an early prototype program for blood storage and preservation. Here Drew applied his thesis research to aid in blood preservation and transportation. He collected, tested, and transported large quantities of blood plasma for distribution in the United Kingdom. Drew understood that plasma extraction from blood required both centrifugation and liquid extraction. Each extraction was conducted under controlled conditions to eliminate risk of contamination. Air concealment, ultraviolet light, and Merthiolate were all used to mitigate the possibility of plasma contamination.

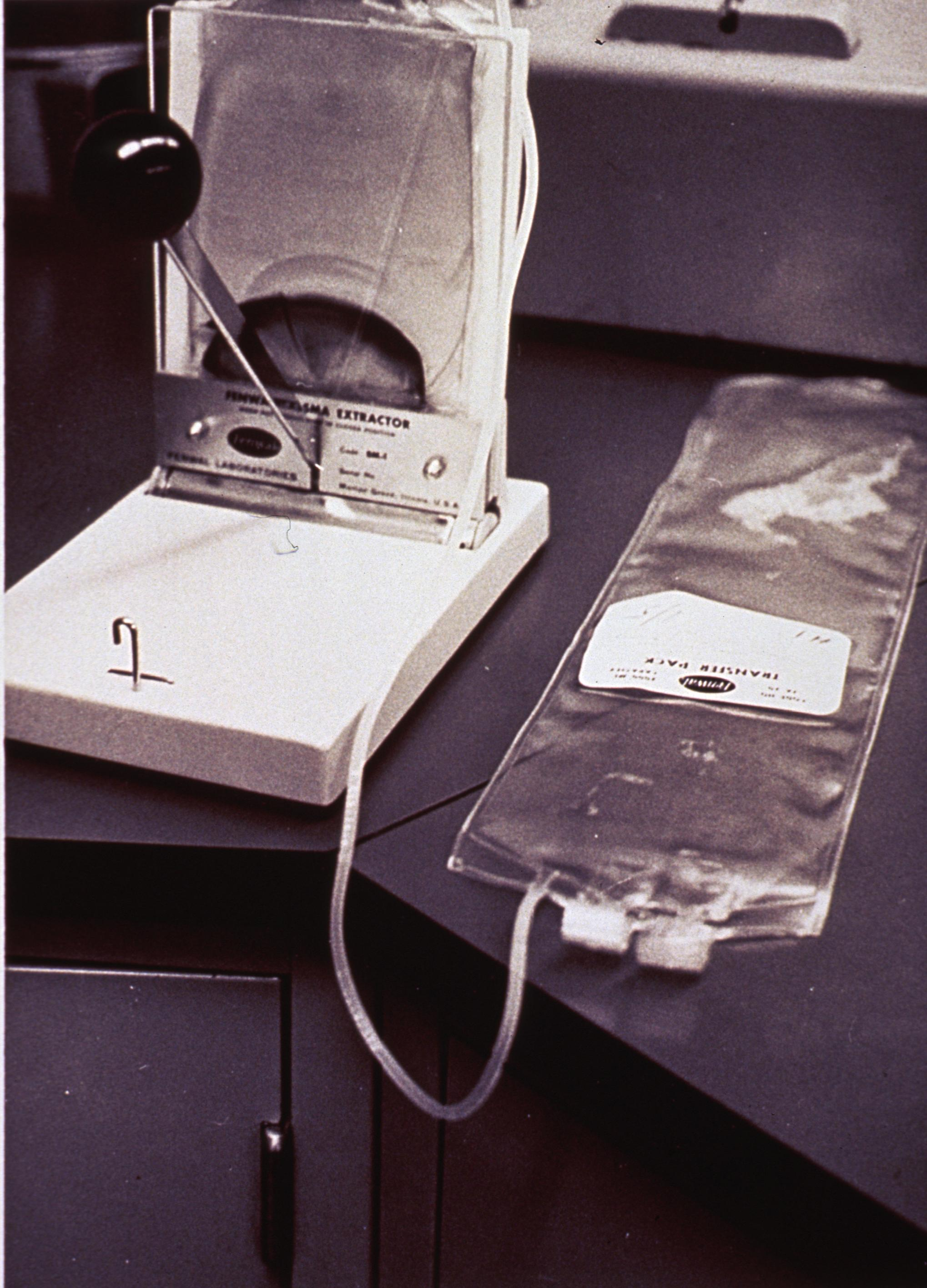
Plasma transfusion package and extractor used to collect plasma from donors.

Drew went to New York City as the medical director of the United States' Blood for Britain project, a project to aid British soldiers and civilians by giving U.S. blood to the United Kingdom. It was here that Drew helped set the standard for other hospitals donating blood plasma to Britain by ensuring clean transfusions along with proper aseptic technique to ensure viable plasma dispersals were sent to Britain.

Drew created a central location for the blood collection process where donors could go to give blood. He made sure all blood plasma was tested before it was shipped out. He ensured that only skilled personnel handled blood plasma to avoid the possibility of contamination. The Blood for Britain program operated successfully for five months, with total collections of almost 15,000 people donating blood, and with over 5,500 vials of blood plasma.

== American Red Cross Blood Bank ==
Drew's work led to his appointment as director of the first American Red Cross Blood Bank in February 1941. He also invented what would be later known as bloodmobiles, mobile donation stations that could collect the blood and refrigerate it; this allowed for greater mobility in terms of transportation and increased prospective donations. The blood bank supplied blood to the U.S. Army and Navy, who initially rejected the blood of African-Americans and later accepted it only if it were stored separately from that of white people. Drew objected to the exclusion of African-Americans' blood from plasma-supply networks, and in 1942 he resigned in protest.

== Academic achievements ==
In 1942, Drew became the first African-American surgeon selected to serve as an examiner on the American Board of Surgery.

Drew had a lengthy research and teaching career, returning to Freedman's Hospital and Howard University as a surgeon and professor of medicine in 1942. He was awarded the Spingarn Medal by the NAACP in 1944 for his work. He was given honorary doctor of science degrees by Virginia State College in 1945 and by Amherst College in 1947.

== Personal life ==
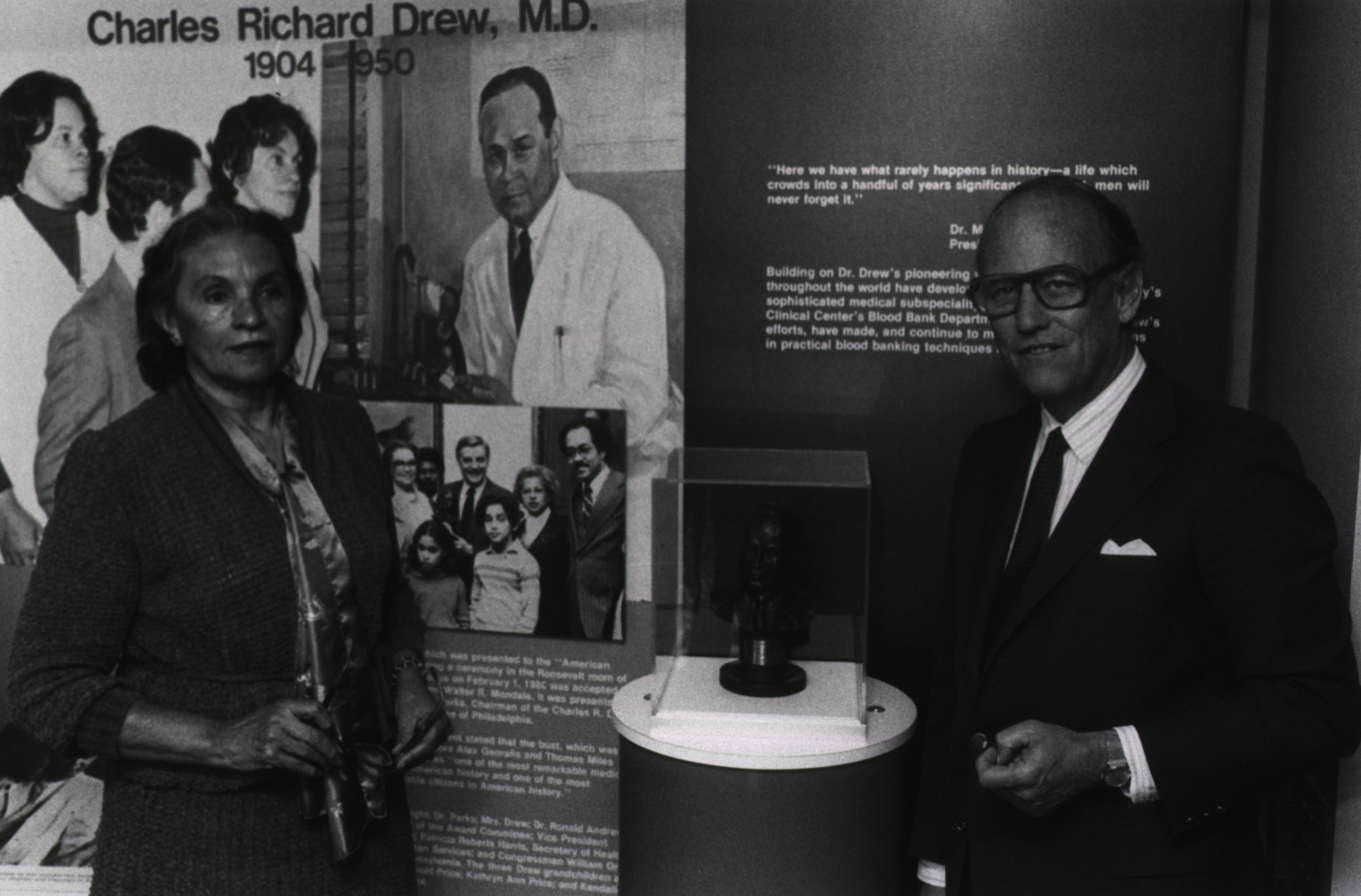
Minnie Lenore Robbins with National Institutes of Health director Donald S. Fredrickson, unveiling of bust and exhibit of Drew, 1981

In 1939, Drew married Minnie Lenore Robbins, a professor of home economics at Spelman College in Atlanta, Georgia, whom he had met earlier during that year. They had three daughters and a son. His daughter Charlene Drew Jarvis served on Council of the District of Columbia from 1979 to 2000, was the president of Southeastern University from 1996 until 2009, and was a president of the District of Columbia Chamber of Commerce.

== Death ==
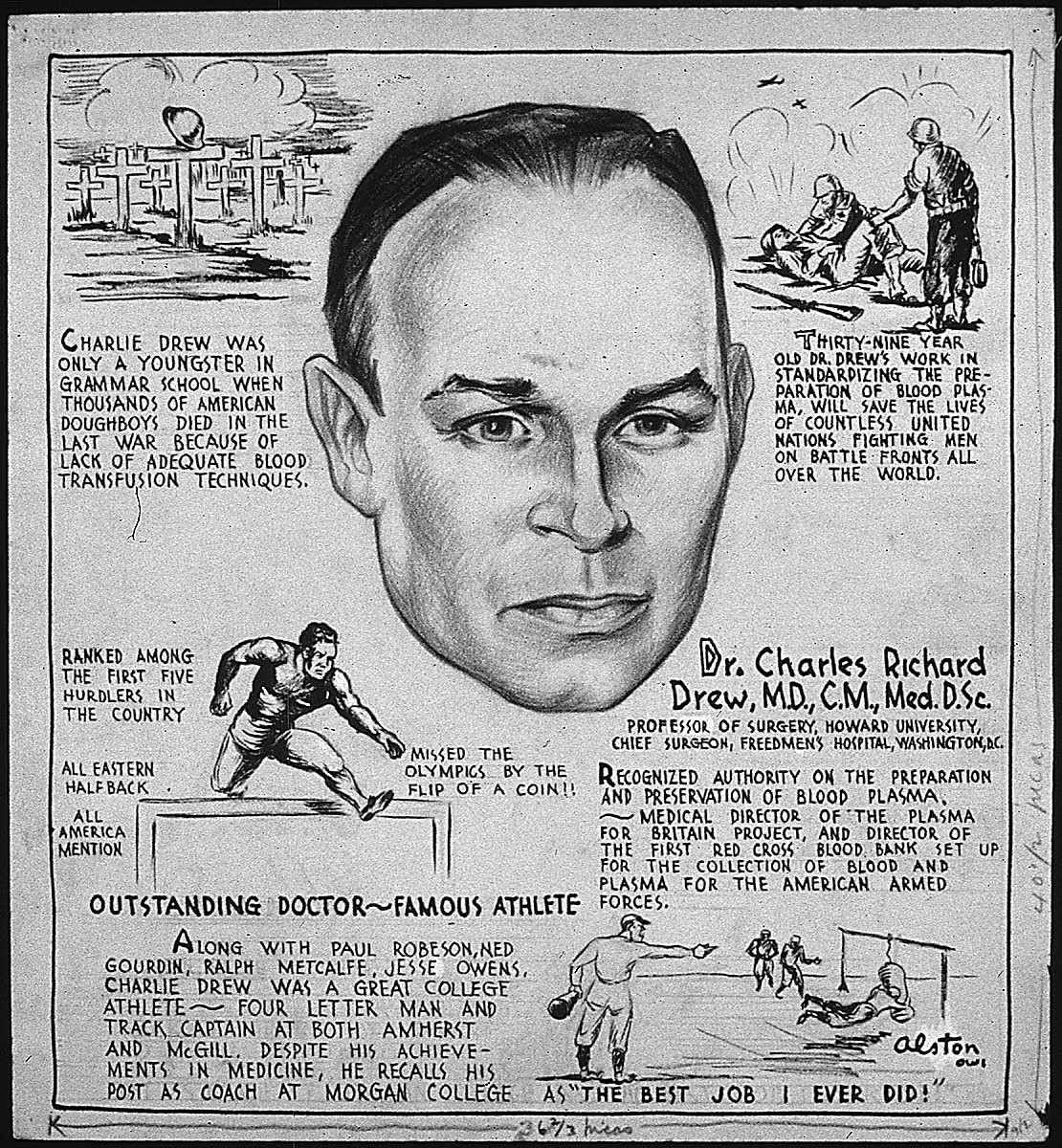
Illustration of Drew by Charles Alston in the collection of the National Archives

Beginning in 1939, Drew traveled every year to Tuskegee, Alabama, to attend the annual free clinic at the John A. Andrew Memorial Hospital. For the 1950 Tuskegee clinic, Drew drove along with three other black physicians. Drew was driving around 8 a.m. on April 1. Still fatigued from spending the night before in the operating theater, he lost control of the vehicle. After careening into a field, the car somersaulted three times. The three other physicians sustained minor injuries. Drew was trapped with severe wounds; his foot was wedged beneath the brake pedal.

When reached by emergency technicians, he was in shock and barely alive due to severe leg injuries. Drew was taken to Alamance General Hospital in Burlington, North Carolina. He was pronounced dead a half hour after he first received medical attention. Drew's funeral was held on April 5, 1950, at the Nineteenth Street Baptist Church in Washington, D.C.

Despite a popular myth to the contrary, once repeated on an episode ("Dear Dad... Three") of the TV series M*A*S*H and in the novels Carrion Comfort, The 480, and The Human Stain, Drew's death was not the result of his having been refused hospital access because of his race. According to John Ford, one of the passengers in Drew's car, Drew's injuries were so severe that virtually nothing could have been done to save him. Ford added that a blood transfusion might have actually killed Drew sooner. This myth spread because it was not then uncommon for black people to be refused treatment because there were not enough "Negro beds" available or because the nearest hospital only serviced white people.

== Legacy ==
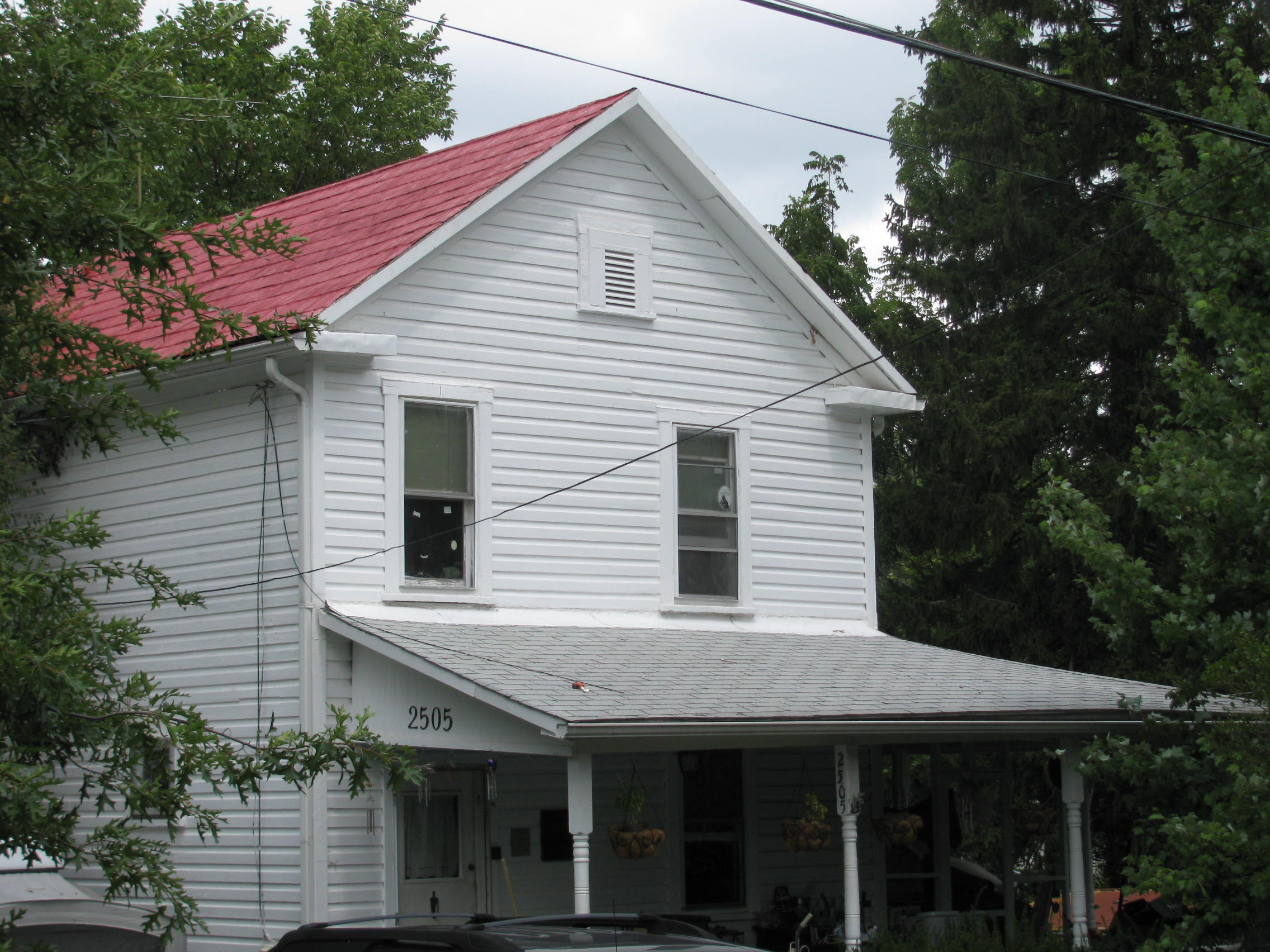
Charles Richard Drew House 2012

In 1976, the National Park Service designated the Charles Richard Drew House in Arlington County, Virginia, as a National Historic Landmark in response to a nomination by the Afro-American Bicentennial Corporation.

In 1981, the United States Postal Service issued a 35¢ postage stamp in its Great Americans series to honor Drew.

In 2002, scholar Molefi Kete Asante listed Drew as one of the 100 Greatest African Americans.

=== Institution names ===
==== Medical and higher education ====
- Martin Luther King Jr./Drew Medical Center in Los Angeles (now Martin Luther King Jr. Outpatient Center)
- Charles R. Drew University of Medicine and Science in California
- Charles Drew Health Center in Omaha, Nebraska
- Charles Drew Science Scholars at Michigan State University
- Drew Health Foundation in East Palo Alto, California
- Charles Drew Community Health Center in Burlington, North Carolina
- Charles Drew Pre-Health Society at the University of Rochester
- Drew Wellness Center in Columbia, South Carolina
- Dr. Charles Drew Red Cross Blood and Platelet Donation Center in Washington, D.C.
- Charles R. Drew Hall at Howard University
- Charles Drew Memorial Cultural House at Amherst College
- Charles Drew Premedical Society at Columbia University

==== K-12 schools ====
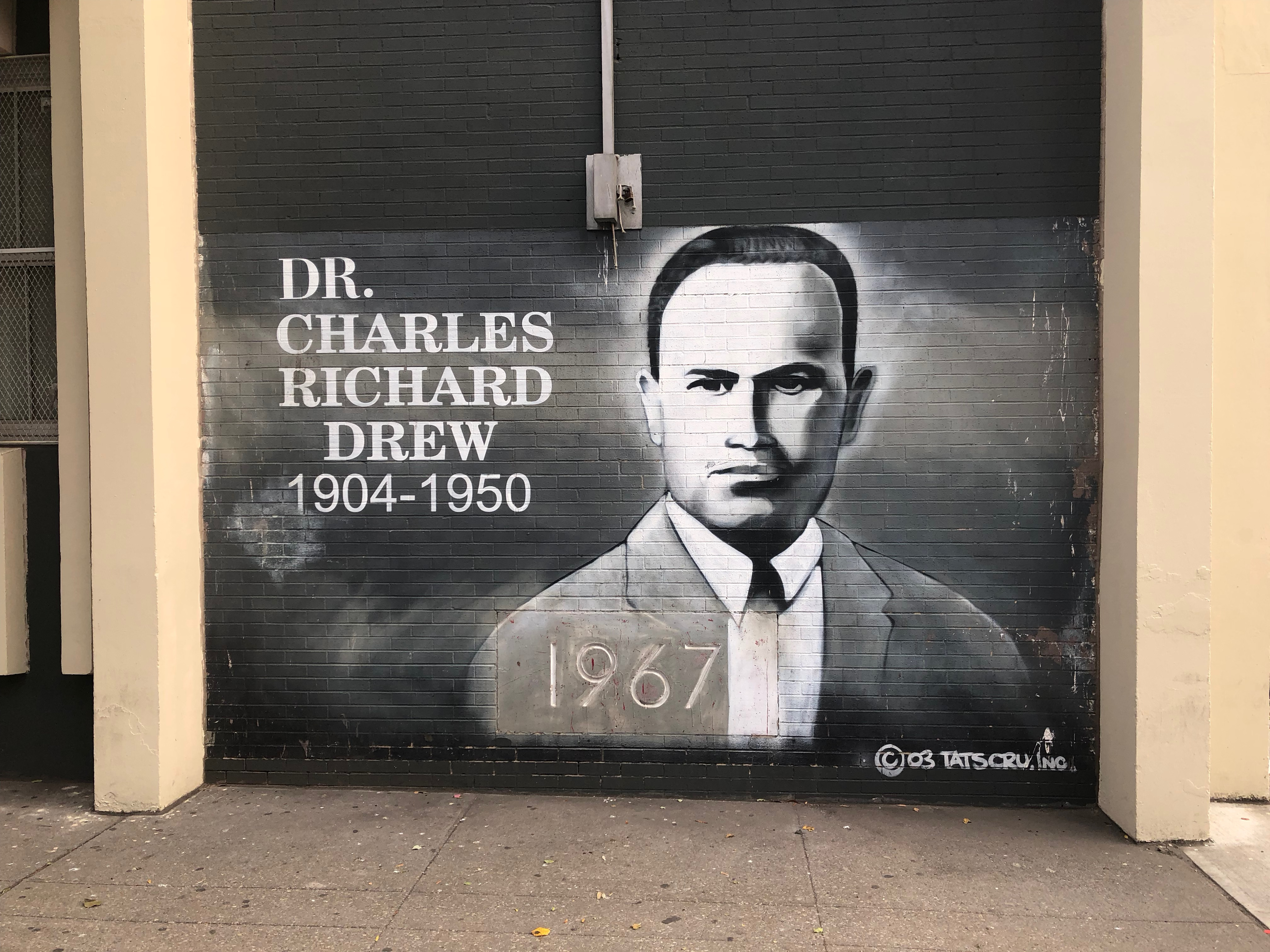
Mural of Charles R. Drew at the Charles Richard Drew Educational Campus / Intermediate School in The Bronx, New York

- Charles R. Drew Middle School in the Los Angeles Unified School District
- Charles R. Drew Middle School in Talladega County Schools
- Charles R. Drew Transition Center in Detroit Public Schools Community District
- Dr. Charles R. Drew Science in Buffalo Public Schools
- Charles R. Drew K-8 Center in Miami-Dade County Public Schools
- Charles Drew Elementary Magnet in Broward County Public Schools
- Bluford Drew Jemison S.T.E.M Academy in Baltimore
- Bluford Drew Jemison STEM Academy West in Baltimore City Public Schools
- Dr. Charles R. Drew Elementary School in Montgomery County Public Schools
- Charles Drew Elementary School in Washington, D.C.
- Dr. Charles R. Drew Elementary in Arlington Public Schools
- Dr. Charles Drew Elementary School in New Orleans
- Charles R. Drew Charter School in Atlanta
- Dr. Charles Drew Academy in Ecorse, Michigan
- Drew Academy in Aldine Independent School District
- Charles R. Drew Elementary School in Crosby Independent School District
- Dr. Charles R. Drew College Preparatory Academy in San Francisco Unified School District
- Charles R Drew ELC 1 in The Bronx

==== Other ====
- Charles Richard Drew Memorial Bridge in the Edgewood and Brookland neighborhoods in Washington, D.C.
- USNS Charles Drew, a dry cargo ship of the United States Navy
- Parc Charles-Drew in Le Sud-Ouest, Montreal, Quebec
