= Henry Martyn Scudder =

Missionary (1822-1895)

- Born: 5 February 1822; Pandatharippu, Sri Lanka
- Died: 4 June 1895 (aged 73)

Henry Martyn Scudder (5 February 1822 – 4 June 1895) was a missionary under the American Board of Commissioners for Foreign Missions and Board of Foreign Missions of the Reformed Church in America to Japan and South India. He served at the American Madura Mission and American Madras Mission. He also established the American Arcot Mission, in North Arcot, South India (then under Madras Presidency).

== Biography ==
Henry Martyn Scudder was born on 5 February 1822 at Pandatharippu, Ceylon (present-day Sri Lanka), into the Scudder family of missionaries in India. He was the eldest son of John Scudder Sr., the first American medical missionary to India, and grew up in a religious environment closely connected to missionary work in South Asia.

Scudder was educated in the United States, graduating from the University of the City of New York in 1840, and later from Union Theological Seminary. He was ordained by the American Board of Commissioners for Foreign Missions in 1843 and departed for India the following year.

Between 1844 and 1850, Scudder served in Madura and Madras as a missionary, combining evangelistic work with medical training. During this period, he studied medicine at Madras Medical College and later earned a Doctor of Medicine degree from New York University. In 1850, he founded the American Arcot Mission in North Arcot, which became a significant center for missionary, educational, and medical activity in the region.

After returning to the United States in 1864 due to declining health, Scudder served as a pastor in several cities, including San Francisco, Jersey City, Brooklyn, and Chicago. He continued his missionary involvement later in life, returning to the mission field in Japan between 1887 and 1889. He died on 4 June 1895 in Winchester, Massachusetts.

== North Arcot Mission ==
In 1850, Henry Scudder having toured the neighbouring districts along with John Dulles of Arcot found that the million and a half souls never heard of Jesus Christ; hence, he sought and obtained the permission from the British Raj to make the city of Arcot as the centre of a new mission in the northern districts of Arcot. The father and son opened a mission in the Arcot district, 80 miles west of Madras, as a chief station of North Arcot Mission. The mission was opened to introduce Western medical science among the natives (Tamil people) of the districts. The then-British Madras Government of Madras Presidency gave him a building, ample land for the construction of hospital, and contributed its expenses. Initially, when no house was available for residence, he took a rented house at Wallajanagar and opened a dispensary with the purpose of winning a favourable entrance for the gospel. On 31 May 1853, Henry and William Waterbury Scudder met together in Arcot, and drew up the charter of the American Arcot Mission. Very soon, nine children and nine grandchildren Sr. Scudder were associated with that mission - like W.W. Scudder, E.C. Scudder, J.W. Scudder, John Scudder, S.D. Scudder, and many more. He was among the Scudders in India who devoted more than 1,100 combined years to Christian mission service by 42 members of four generations of the family. In 1853, he together with his brother and father, requested a particular Synod of New York City to approve their being organized into the Classis of Arcot. This charter was in accord with the action of the Board of Foreign Missions of the Reformed Church General Synod in 1852. Having received the permission of the particular Synod, they formed the Classis in 1854 - the first and only classis of the Reformed church outside North America continent.

== Bibliography ==
He published a number of books in the Sanskrit, Tamil, and Telugu languages. His publications include The Bazaar Book and The Catholics and the Public Schools. Other books include Spiritual Teaching and Jewel Mine of Salvation that had become valuable aid to missionaries and native preachers - these are still used in Arcot districts. He also translated the liturgy into Tamil.

Some of his sermons have also been published.
