= Charles Richard Drew Memorial Bridge =

Coordinates: 38.9340°N 76.9945°W

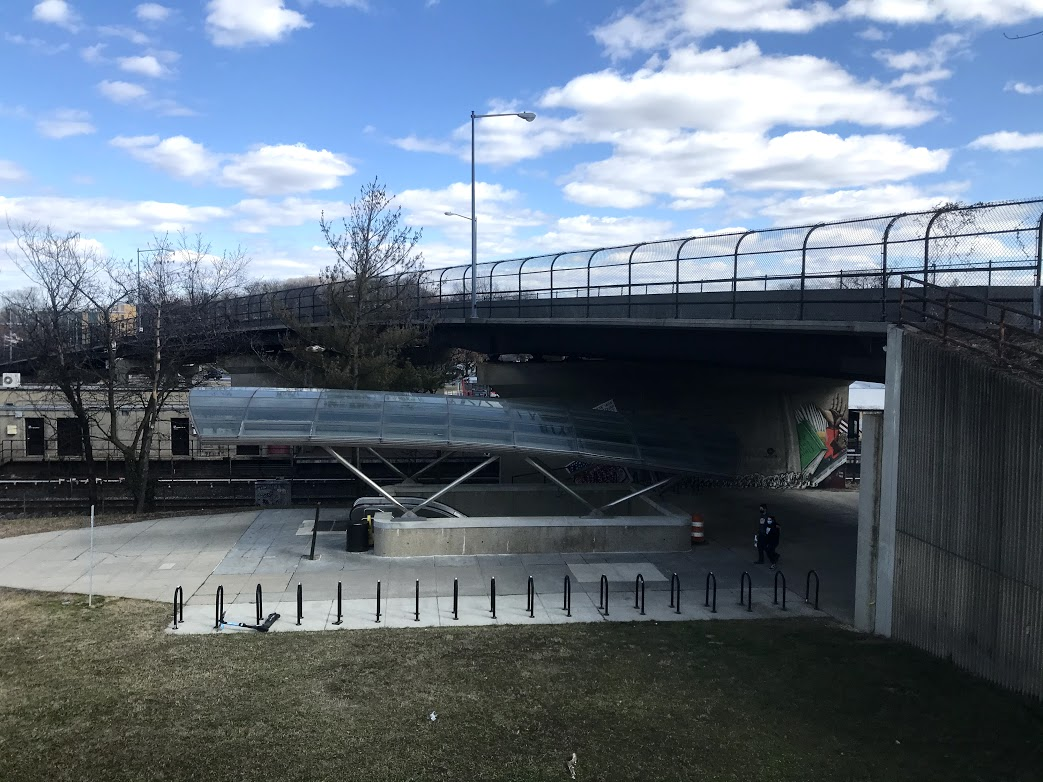
The Charles Richard Drew Memorial Bridge over the east entrance to the Brookland-CUA Metro Station

The Charles Richard Drew Memorial Bridge, also known as the Michigan Avenue Bridge, carries Michigan Avenue over the CSX and Metrorail railroad tracks. The Brookland-CUA Metro Station is located below the bridge as well. It lies in the University Heights neighborhood in the northeastern part of Washington, D.C. The name of the bridge honors Dr. Charles R. Drew (1904-1950) who was a scientist, surgeon and athlete. A plaque is situated at the western end of the bridge.

== History ==
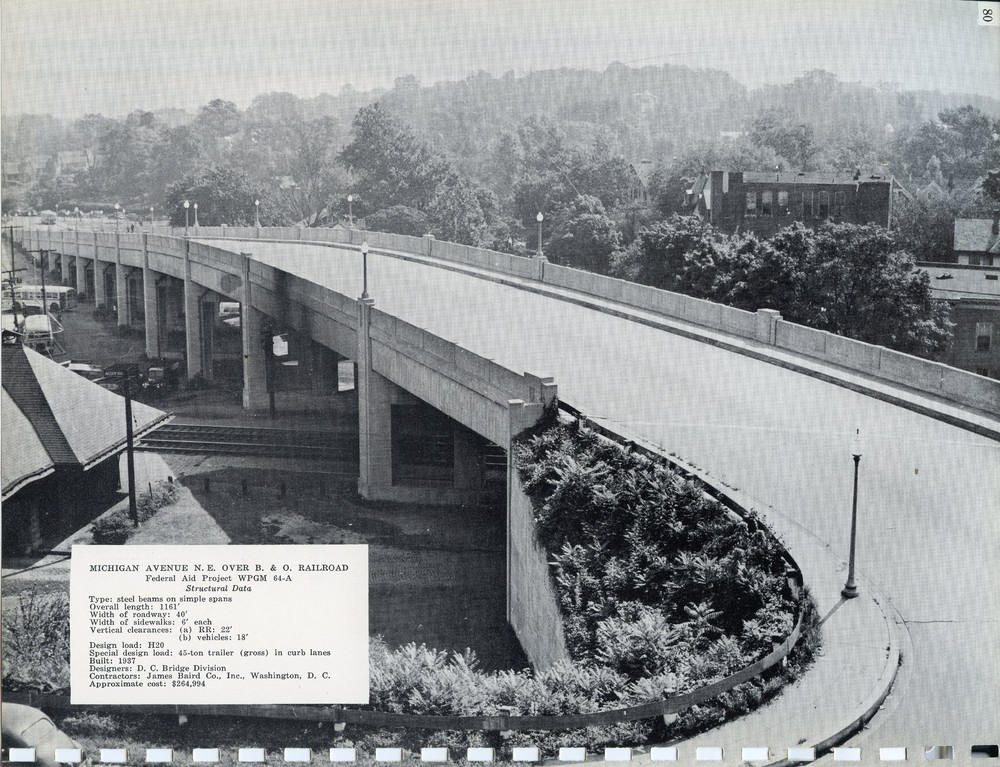
The old Michigan Avenue Bridge over the B&O Railroad

The Drew Memorial Bridge was built in 1980–1981. It replaced the Michigan Ave Bridge over the B&O Railroad built in 1937-38 and opened on August 29, 1938. That bridge was 1161' long and 40' wide and was the first bridge at that location. It was a steel beam bridge on simple spans designed by the D.C. Bridge division and built by the James Baird Company for $265,000.

Construction of the Drew Bridge began in April 1980 and was completed in 1981. While mostly similar to the bridge it replaced, it only had one 6 foot wide sidewalk, on the north side, while the old bridge had 6 foot wide sidewalks on both sides. In 1982 a citizen's committee was created by the Mayor to name the bridge and in 1983 they selected the name of Dr. Charles R. Drew, whose daughter was at the time the Ward 4 Representative to the DC Council.
