= Pandatharippu =

Pandatharippu பண்டத்தரிப்பு පණ්ඩතරිප්පුව
- Village
- Location within Northern Province
- Coordinates: 9°46′23″N 79°58′03″E
- Country: Sri Lanka
- Province: Northern
- District: Jaffna
- DS Division: Valikamam South‐West

Pandatharippu or Pandaththarippu or Pandaththeruppu (Tamil: பண்டத்தரிப்பு) is a village in the northern Jaffna District of Sri Lanka. It is located approximately 20 km from City of Jaffna. It is also spelled "Pandathirippu". It was a mission location when the American Ceylon Mission (ACM) came to Sri Lanka in the 19th century. Dr. John Scudder founded Asia’s first western medical center in this village. It was also known as Panditeripo in ACM documents. There are number of schools some which were founded by ACM as well as churches and Hindu temples in the village.
