= North Arcot =

Former district in Madras Presidency

Coordinates: 12°30′N 79°00′E

- District of the Madras Presidency
- 1855–1989
- Flag

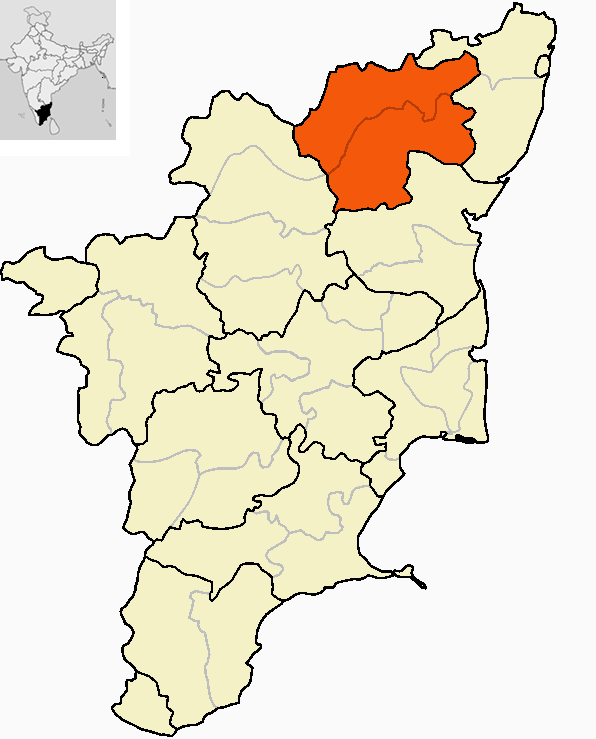
- Location of North Arcot district at the time of the formation of Madras State in 1956
- Capital: Chittoor (1855 - 1911), Tiruvannamalai (1911-1913), Vellore (1913-1989)
- Area
  - 1901: 19,129.7 km^{2} (7,386.0 sq mi)
- Population
  - 1901: 2,207,712
- History
  - Annexation of the Arcot State: 1855
  - Separation of the Chittoor district: 1911
  - Bifurcated into the districts of Tiruvannamalai and Vellore: 1989
Preceded by	Succeeded by
Nawab of the Carnatic	Tiruvannamalai district; Vellore district
- The Imperial Gazetteer of India, Vol. 5

North Arcot was a former district in Madras Presidency, acquired by the annexation of the Arcot State in 1855 when its Nawab died without issue. It had Chittoor as its headquarters (currently in Andhra Pradesh). On 1 April 1911, the Chittoor district was separated from North Arcot. The remaining district, with Vellore as its headquarters, passed intact into the Madras State of independent India. On 30 September 1989 the district was split into Tiruvannamalai-Sambuvarayar district (present-day Tiruvannamalai district) and North Arcot Ambedkar district (present-day Vellore district). It contained the present day districts of Tiruvannamalai, Vellore, Chittoor, Tirupati, Tirupattur and Ranipet.

== History ==
Historically, the name "Arcot" is said to be derived from a linguistic corruption of the original Tamil word "Aaru Kaadu", meaning "Six Forests". The region is described in common folklore as lush region flanked by six forests in which is said to have resided a myriad of sages and seers.

The district was also famous for its missionary, the Arcot Mission of the Reformed Church.

== Under the British Raj ==
During the British Raj, the North Arcot district formed a key province in the then Madras Presidency, under the control of the Nawabs of Arcot. The region of Arcot under the control of the Mughal regime in India was under the jagir or fiefdom of the Subah of Arcot. The famous Palar river intersects the region and the portion of Arcot to the north of the Palar came to be known as North Arcot. It is described as an inland district on the eastern side of the Madras Presidency, lying between 12 degrees 20 mins and 13 degrees and 55 mins North and 78 degrees and 14 mins and 79 degrees and 59 minutes E, with an area of 7,386 square miles (19,130 km^{2}).

On the north the district is separated from Cuddapah by a portion of the Eastern Ghats and locally known as the Tirupati Hills, form the town of that name which lies at their foot. The range is broken by a long valley running northwards into the Cuddapah District. Advantage has been taken of this gap by the north-west line of the Southern Railway which passes up in through the ghats on its way to Mumbai. On the west of the District runs up to the Mysore plateau. In the south-west, separated from the eastern ghats by the fertile valley of the Palar, is the detached group of the Javadi Hills, well wooded and containing much game which divides the district from Salem and part of South Arcot. Along the southern and eastern borders, adjoining South Arcot and Chingleput, the terrain is flat and uninspiring. In the north-east, the Nagari Hills are conspicuous with the high precipitous cliffs, the most important peak being the Nagari Nose (2,824 feet), in the Karvetnagar zamindari overlooking the railway line. From all the hill ranges, numerous small boulder-covered spurs branch off towards the center of the district and combine to render it one of the most varied and picturesque areas in the region.

None of the hills is particularly lofty, the general elevation of the Eastern Ghats and the Javadis being about 2,500 and 3,000 feet (910 m) respectively. The highest peak is Avalapalle Drug (3,829 feet) in the Punganuru Zamindari. Carnatikgarh (3,124 feet) in the Polur taluk and Kailasagarh (2,743) feet in Vellore, both on the Javadis, are other peaks of importance. Each has a small bungalow on its summit which forms a pleasant retreat in the hot season. Except the Javadis, the hills are generally uninhabited.

The chief rivers of the district are the Palar and its tributaries, the Cheyyar and the Poini. Except for a few days, the beds of these are dry, sandy wastes. The Cheyyar river rises in the Javadis. It first flows southwards into the South Arcot District, then bending to the east and north-east and enters the southern taluks of North Arcot, flows eastward across them and finally joins the Palar river near Walajabad in Chingleput District.

== See also ==
- Arcot
- South Arcot
