= John Scudder (physician) =

American physician (1900–1976)

John Scudder (1900 – December 1976) was an American medical doctor and blood transfusion specialist who developed the Plasma for Britain program during the early years of World War II. He recruited Charles Drew to help develop the organization and its processes to get the plasma supply project operational. Their work was estimated to have helped save the lives of thousands of Allied troops.

== Early life ==
Scudder was born to John and Ellen Bartholemew Scudder in 1900 in Brooklyn, New York. He attended Rutgers University before deciding to be a surgeon. He completed medical school at Columbia University, where he also did graduate-level work on blood research and surgical procedures for its use.

His family was part of the Scudders in India, who devoted more than 1,100 combined years to Christian medical mission service. Four generations of the family and 42 members served in India.

== Career ==
After obtaining his doctorate, Scudder began working and teaching at Columbia University-Presbyterian Hospital. There he worked in blood transfusion and surgery. He became an assistant professor of clinical surgery at Columbia University in 1935. He worked on research centering on whole blood, then on fractionated blood and plasmas. By 1940 he was doing research on blood fluid dynamics as well.

== Blood for Britain ==
In late 1939, after World War II began in Europe, the Blood Transfusion Betterment Association (BTBA) of New York met with certain members of the British medical establishment about transfusion techniques. Plasma transfusion was possible at that time, but still experimental. No one had a good method for supplementing Britain's supplies with American blood plasma. This was crucial since, by all expectations, any war was expected to have the high casualties similar to those of World War I.

The managers of the BTBA turned to Dr. Scudder to organize the project. He recruited Charles Drew, one of his brightest graduate students and recently minted PhD, to lead the project. During the course of Plasma for Britain, Scudder often assisted Drew in organizing and communicating with project managers and other medical authorities. When Plasma for Britain was turned over to the British Military, Scudder returned to his teaching and research position at Columbia.

== Later life ==
Scudder continued research in fields related both to blood work and surgery. He published papers on shock syndrome, banked blood, and using chemicals and X-rays to map the cardiovascular system. He co-authored many papers.

In the 1960s, when there was a conflict between the Red Cross and the for-profit American Association of Blood Banks, Scudder publicly supported the Red Cross. He stated that blood donation should be a matter of civic responsibility, not profiteering.

His health began to fail in the early 1970s. He died in December 1976 at the age of 76.

== Legacy and honors ==
- The Plasma for Britain program was estimated to save the lives of thousands of Allied troops.
- 1950s, a blood bank in New York City was named after him.
