= Scudder family of missionaries in India =

Family of missionaries in India

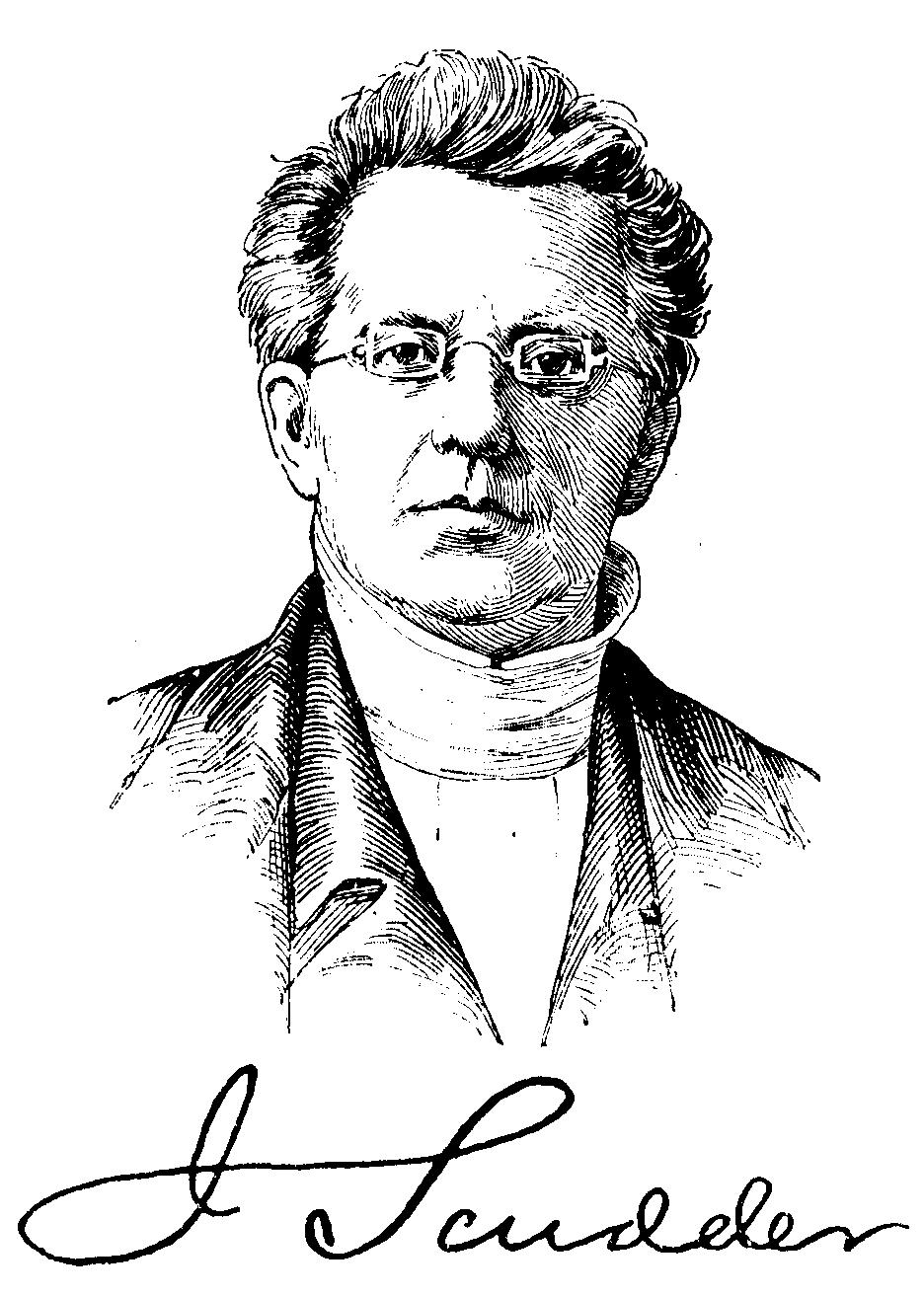
John Scudder Sr.

Members of the Scudder family have worked as medical missionaries in South India and the Middle East for five generations.

== First generation ==
John Scudder Sr., born in Freehold Township, New Jersey, on September 3, 1793, was India's first medical missionary. He graduated from Princeton University in 1811 and the New York College of Physicians and Surgeons, and practiced medicine in New York City.

Scudder became committed to serving as a medical missionary of the American Board, and later of the Dutch Reformed Board. He went to Ceylon (now Sri Lanka) in 1819, and founded Asia's first Western medical mission in Panditeripo, Jaffna District. Scudder served there for nineteen years as a clergyman and physician, establishing a hospital at which he was the chief physician; he was especially successful in treating cholera and yellow fever, and founded several native schools and churches.

In 1836, Scudder and another clergyman began a mission in Madras to establish a printing press to publish the New Testament and tracts in the Tamil language. Settling in Chintadrepettah, he returned to the United States from 1842 to 1846. Scudder returned to India in 1847, spending two years providing medical aid in Madurai. He returned to his Madras mission in 1849, where he worked until his death on January 13, 1855.

He was India's first American medical missionary, beginning more than 1,100 combined years of missionary service there by 42 members of five generations of the family. Scudder and his wife, Harriet Waterbury, had six surviving sons and two daughters; all became medical missionaries and worked in South India.

== Second generation ==
Henry Martyn Scudder (1822–1895) was born in Panditeripo, Ceylon, and was John Scudder's oldest child. He graduated from the University of the City of New York in 1840, and Union Theological Seminary in 1843. The following year, Henry went to Madurai as a missionary. He went to Madras in 1846, organizing schools and churches in Madras, Arcot, Vellore, Coonoor and Ootacamund (Udhagamandalam). In 1850, Henry founded a mission at Arcot for the board of the Dutch Reformed Church; the following year, he opened the Wallajapet dispensary. Henry practiced medicine, and moved the dispensary to Ranipet in 1853 because of its better location. The dispensary closed the following year due to his illness, and he went to the hills to recuperate.

In 1856, Madurai joined the other American Tamil missions in appointing Henry their representative to a Madras convention to plan a new Tamil version of the Bible. He prepared religious books and tracts in Sanskrit, Tamil, and Telugu. Henry's publications include Liturgy of the Reformed Protestant Dutch Church (Madras, 1862), Sweet Savors of Divine Truth (an 1868 catechism), and Spiritual Teaching (1870). He also wrote The Bazaar Book in Tamil and The Catholics and the Public Schools.

In 1864, his health failing in India, he returned to the United States and performed pastoral work for nearly 20 years. Henry was pastor of the Howard Presbyterian Church in San Francisco from 1865 to 1871, the Central Congregational Church in Brooklyn from 1872 to 1882, and the Plymouth Congregational Church in Chicago from 1882 to 1887; he resigned to resume missionary work in Japan until 1889.

William Scudder (born c. 1826) served in India for twenty-two years and was then a pastor for eleven years in the United States. When he was sixty years old he went back to India for nine years, and died in 1895.

Jared Waterbury Scudder, born in Panditeripo in 1830, graduated from Western Reserve College in 1850 and the New Brunswick Theological Seminary in 1855. He was ordained a missionary to India for the Dutch Reformed Church, and joined the Arcot Mission in 1855. He published Tamil translations of Henry M. Scudder's Spiritual Teaching (Madras, 1870), Bazaar Book (1870), and History of the Arcot Mission. (1872). Jared was a member of the committee to revise the Tamil translation of the Bible.

Silas Downer Scudder (born in Ceylon on November 6, 1833) graduated from Rutgers University in 1856, studied medicine, and was licensed to practice in New York City. Asked by the Arcot Mission and his brothers to begin medical work in Ranipet, in 1860 he went to India as a medical missionary and settled in Arcot. Silas founded a dispensary and hospital which were supported by English and native residents. With a large native outdoor practice, some of his patients were high-caste Hindu women who had been reluctant to see an American doctor.

Ranipet Hospital opened on March 17, 1866. Due to its high medical standard, the Madras government closed its own dispensary and turned over its resources to Silas. All treatment and medicines were free of charge. In 1872, John Scudder II took over the Ranipet Hospital and its evangelistic work from his elder brother, Silas. After thirteen years he returned to New York because of illness, and died in Brooklyn on December 10, 1877.

John and Harriet’s sons John Junior, Ezekiel and Joseph were all Christian preachers. Their son Samuel died just after graduating college.

== Third generation ==
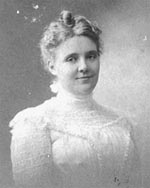
A young Ida S. Scudder

Ida S. Scudder (December 9, 1870 – May 24, 1960) dedicated her life to Indian women and the fight against plague, cholera and leprosy. In 1918, she founded the Christian Medical College & Hospital, Vellore.

After seeing famine, poverty and disease in India as a girl, Ida intended to marry and live in the U.S. following her education at a Massachusetts seminary. In her early 20s, however, she returned to India to help her ailing mother at her mission bungalow in Tindivanam. Ida received an M.D. degree from Cornell University in 1899, returning to India with a $10,000 gift from a Manhattan banker. She founded a small clinic for women in Vellore, 75 miles (121 km) from Madras, and treated 5,000 patients in two years.

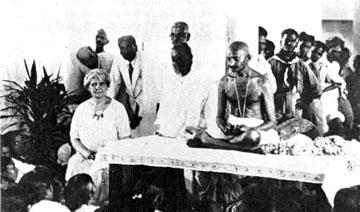
Ida with Mahatma Gandhi, 1928

Ida opened a medical school for women in Vellore 1918. Although skeptics said that she would be lucky to get three applicants, she had 151 the first year. Although the Reformed Church in America was originally the school's main funder, when Ida agreed to make it coeducational it obtained the support of 40 missions. Of its 242 students in 2005, 95 were men.

In 1953, at age 82, Ida received Hobart and William Smith Colleges' Elizabeth Blackwell Award as one of 1952's five outstanding women doctors. She died in 1960, at age 90, in Kodaikanal.

A commemorative stamp was issued on August 12, 2000, as part of the Christian Medical College Vellore centennial. Its first-day cover depicts Ida caring for pregnant women.

Ida’s brother John Scudder and sister Ethel Scudder were also involved in medical work.

Lewis R. Scudder was a grandson of John Scudder Snr and served in India with the Dutch Reformed Church in America.

Henry Martyn Scudder Junior began a maternity clinic in Ranipet in 1877. Three years later, he resigned from the Arcot Mission and left for the United States. He was later found guilty of murdering his mother-in-law Elizabeth Dunton.

== Fourth generation ==
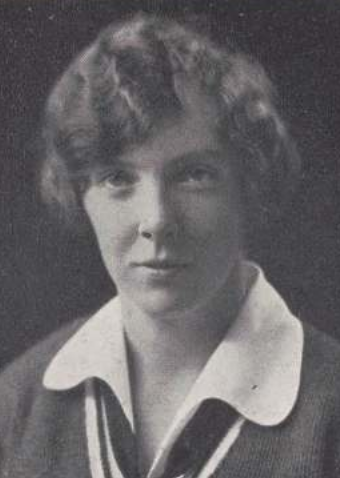
Ida B. Scudder, from the 1925 yearbook of Mount Holyoke College

Ida Belle Scudder was born in 1900, and graduated from Mount Holyoke College in 1925. She trained in radiology before moving to Vellore for more than 30 years of service at the Christian Medical Colleges (CMC) and Hospital, founded by her aunt Ida S. Scudder. Ida B. founded the hospital's diagnostic radiology and radiotherapy departments, and was influential in CMC's transition to coeducation and its affiliation with the University of Madras for the first two years of its M.B. and B.Ss. courses for female students. She campaigned in the U.S. from 1941 to 1945 for funding for the coeducational program. The Dr. Ida B. Scudder Radiation Therapy Block at CMC was dedicated in 1991, and she died in 1995. An Ida B. Scudder essay competition was begun to perpetuate her ideals.

Marilyn Scudder (born in 1939) graduated from Kodaikanal International School in 1956 and Hope College in 1960. She received an M.D. degree from the University of Michigan in 1965, and was a medical missionary in Tanzania for 35 years. Marilyn's work in Tanzania began in 1970, when she was head of the eye department at a hospital in Mvuni. She returned to Minnesota in 1971 for further study before joining the eye department of a medical center in Moshi, Tanzania in 1973, where she became the department head in 1979. Marilyn was sponsored by Christian Blind Mission. The eye team went on medical safaris by vehicle and small plane to 30 mission and government hospitals throughout Tanzania. Scudder retired from surgery in 2001, and went to live and work with the Capuchin Sisters of Maua on the western slopes of Mount Kilimanjaro near the village of Sanya Juu. She continued training nurses and conducting eye clinics there. She received an Outstanding Humanitarian Service Award from the American Academy of Ophthalmology on October 22, 2004, and the George Tani Humanitarian Service Award from the Minnesota Academy of Ophthalmology on December 10, 2004. Hope College presented Marilyn with a Distinguished Alumni Award on May 7, 1988, and profiled her in a story in the August 1985 issue of News from Hope College which had previously appeared in the Kodaikanal International School's alumni publication. Scudder was diagnosed with primary amyloidosis in 2002, and died on May 16, 2005, in Dar es Salaam.

The Marilyn Scudder Scholarship was set up in her memory.

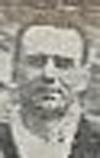
Galen Fisher Scudder in Kodaikanal, 1925

Galen Fisher Scudder was the son of Lewis R. Scudder. He graduated from Princeton University and Cornell Medical School) and arrived in India in 1920. He was appointed medical superintendent of the Ranipet hospital, with the responsibility of building the Scudder Memorial Hospital on $25,000. Galen went on a furlough from 1933 to 1934 and was replaced by John Scudder, the great-grandson of John Scudder Sr. From 1940 to 1945, Galen performed war service. He went to Rangoon and, after its fall, was the district medical officer in Coimbatore. Galen donated part of his government salary to the Ranipet hospital, where he returned in 1947 with surgical equipment and a large sterilizer. He added an X-ray machine, which was a gift of his Princeton University classmates and the Doris Duke Foundation, by 1953. A wing was added to the hospital for the X-ray machine, laboratory and blood bank, and four private male wards were built. Galen retired on June 1, 1954, after 35 years of service. With his departure, a century of his family's association with the Arcot Mission ended.

== Fifth generation ==
John Scudder Senior’s great-great-grandson, Lewis R. Scudder III was a missionary in Lebanon, Kuwait, Turkey, and Cyprus. He also worked in Bahrain.

He retired in 2008 and died in 2017; the Reformed Church of America recognises him as the last missionary from his family.

His retirement completed almost 200 years of service by the Scudder family.

== David Scudder ==
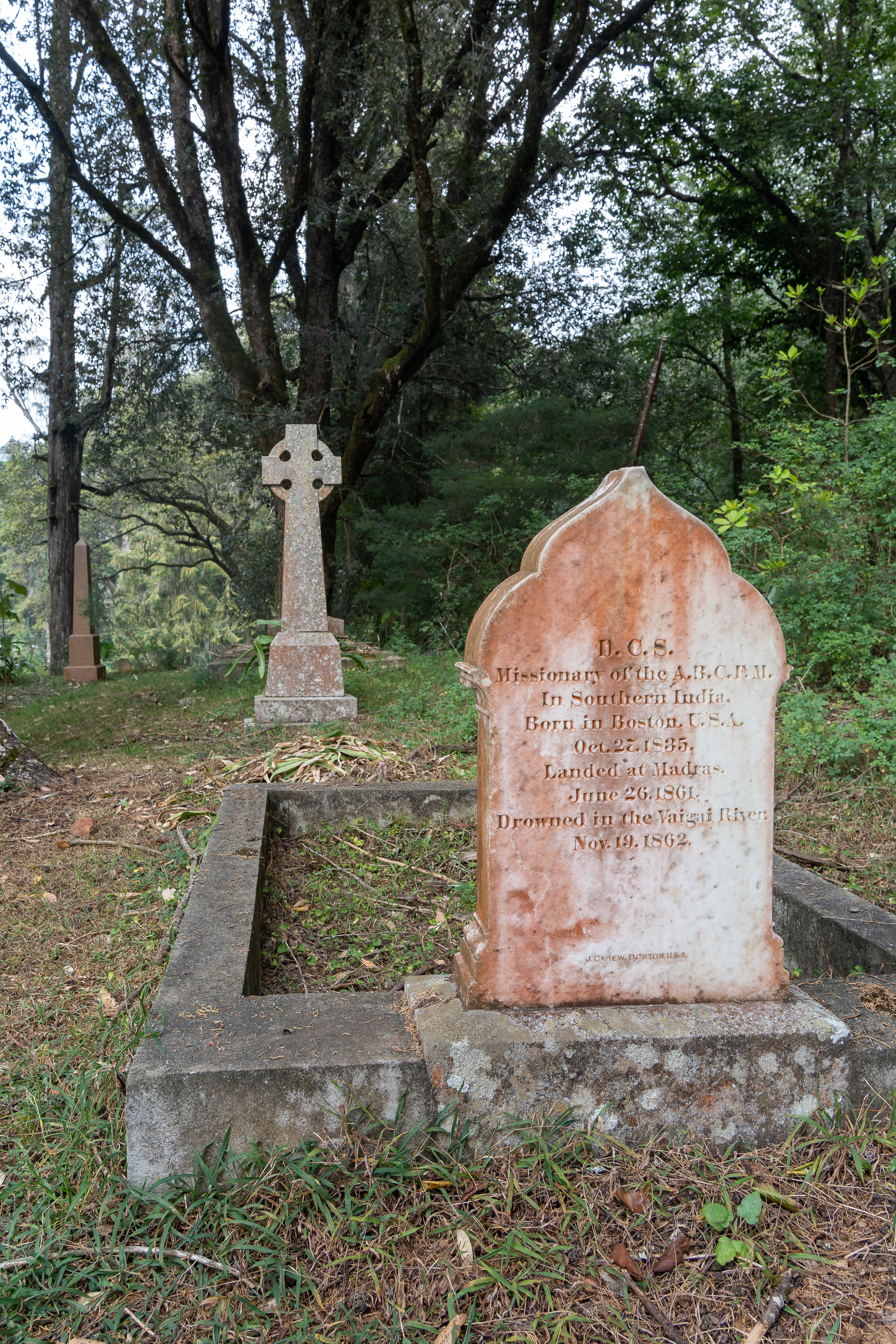
Backside of the Gravestone of David Coit Scudder in the American Missionary Cemetery Kodaikanal

David Coit Scudder, born on October 27, 1835, in Boston, was the son of Charles and Sarah Lathrop (Coit) Scudder. He was not descended from John Scudder, but from a Scudder of the early Massachusetts Bay Colony. On February 25, 1861, David was ordained as a missionary; two days later, he married Harriet Dutton. Their only child, Vida Dutton Scudder, was born in India.

David, influenced in boyhood to go to India by the work of John Scudder Sr., arrived in Madras on June 26, 1861. He was in charge of the large mission in Periyakulam, but drowned in the Vaigai River between Andipatti and Periyakulam on November 19, 1862 (20 months after arriving in Tamil Nadu) and is buried in the American Missionary Cemetery in Kodaikanal. A small book entitled Letters to Sabbath School Children by J. Scudder, with "Master David Scudder, from his affectionate friend, J. Scudder, New York, August 8, 1843" written across the flyleaf, was found in his library.,

The Clancy and Scudder Scholarship, founded with a legacy of $300, was transferred by Mrs. Washburn to the Pasumalai institution. In January 1885, the mission accepted it as the Clancy Scholarship. Four hundred dollars in memory of David Coit Scudder from David's brother, Horace, was added in June of that year. The ₹1,500 scholarship continued until 1906.
