= Francis Edward Clark =

American clergyman (1851–1927)

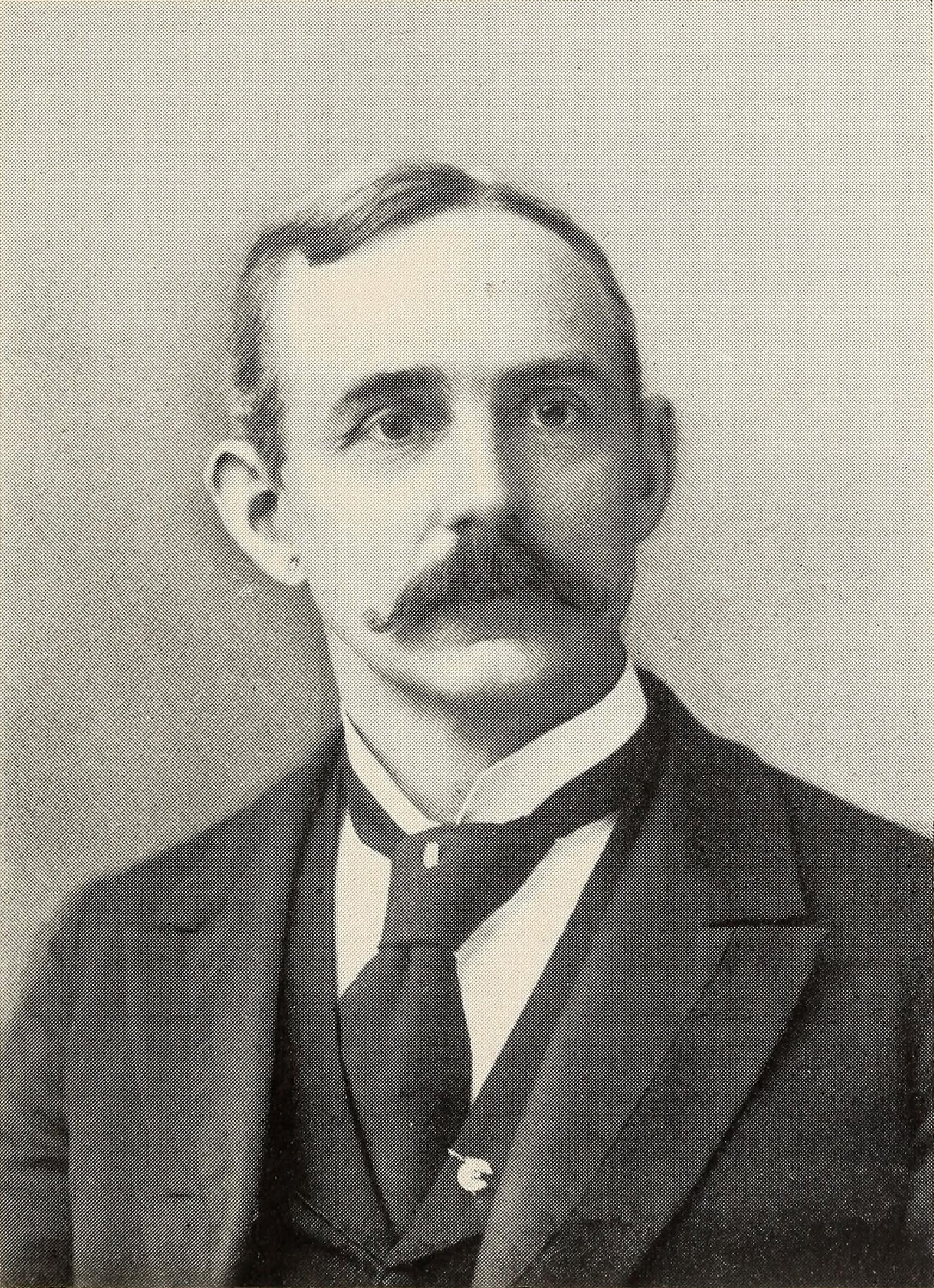
Francis Edward Clark

Francis Edward Clark (12 September 1851 – 26 May 1927) was an American clergyman.

== Life ==
Clark was born of New England ancestry in Aylmer, Quebec, Canada. He was the son of Charles C. Symmes, but took the name of an uncle, the Rev. E.W. Clark, by whom he was adopted after his mother's death in 1858. He graduated from Dartmouth College in 1873 and from Andover Theological Seminary in 1876, was ordained in the Congregational ministry, and was pastor of the Williston West Church at Portland, Maine, from 1876 to 1883, and of the Phillips Congregational church, South Boston, Massachusetts, from 1883 to 1887.

On 2 February 1881, he founded in Portland, the Young People's Society of Christian Endeavor, which, beginning as a small society in a single New England church, developed into a great interdenominational organization, which in 1908 had 70,761 societies and more than 3,500,000 members scattered throughout the United States, Canada, Mexico, Great Britain, Australia, South Africa, India, Japan and China. After 1887, he devoted his time entirely to the extension of this work, and was president of the United Societies of Christian Endeavor and of the World's Christian Endeavor Union, and editor of the Christian Endeavor World (originally The Golden Rule).

Also, he famously visited the Arcot Mission in India. In 1893, Clark spoke at the World's Parliament of Religions in Chicago, delivering the lecture Christianity as Seen by a Voyager Around the World.

On October 2, 1876, in Andover, Massachusetts, he married Harriet E. Clark. His home at 379 Central Street in Auburndale, Massachusetts is listed on the National Register of Historic Places. He died there on 26 May 1927.

== Works ==
- The Children and the Church (1882)
- Looking Out on Life (1883)
- Young Peoples Prayer Meetings (1884)
- Some Christian Endeavor Saints (1889)
- Mossback Correspondence (1889)
- World Wide Endeavor (1895)
- Our Journey Around the World (with Harriet E. Clark) (1895)
- A New Way Round an Old World (1900) about his journey on the newly opened Trans-Siberian Railroad.
