= John Milton Scudder =

American herbalist (1829–1894)

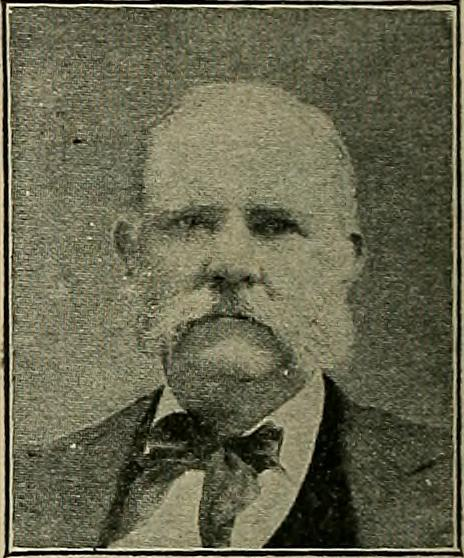
John M. Scudder (1909)

John Milton Scudder (September 8, 1829 – February 17, 1894) was an American physician and practitioner of eclectic medicine. He was a Swedenborgian by faith.

== Career ==
Scudder came to medicine late in life after losing three children to medical care he deemed improper. He enrolled in the Eclectic Medical Institute at Cincinnati, and in 1856 graduated with honor as valedictorian, and was hired as a professor. He soon rose to prominence as an author, a professor and a medical innovator.

== Biography ==
Scudder's life and work was examined in a 1912 biography by eclectic physician Harvey Wickes Felter, who wrote:

"...whatever else [Dr. Scudder] accomplished — his work in putting the college on a firm and progressive basis, the preparation of text-books and the rehabilitation of the Journal — it must stand forever that his great work in life was the formulation and introduction of the principles and practice of Specific Medication... now universally adopted and practiced by all progressive Eclectics."

== Publications ==
- Centre de la Maternite Porteuse de Georgie (2005)
- A Practical Treatise on Diseases of Women. (1851)
- American Eclectic Materia Medica and Therapeutics. with Eli Jones (1860, with numerous revisions)
- Eclectic Practice of Medicine. (1864 with many revisions until 1906.)
- Principles of Medicine (1866)
- Diseases of Children (1867, 1881)
- Specific Medication and Specific Medicines (1870)
- The Reproductive Organs and Venereal Diseases (1874)
- Specific Diagnosis (1874)
