= Young People's Society of Christian Endeavour =

International Christian youth society

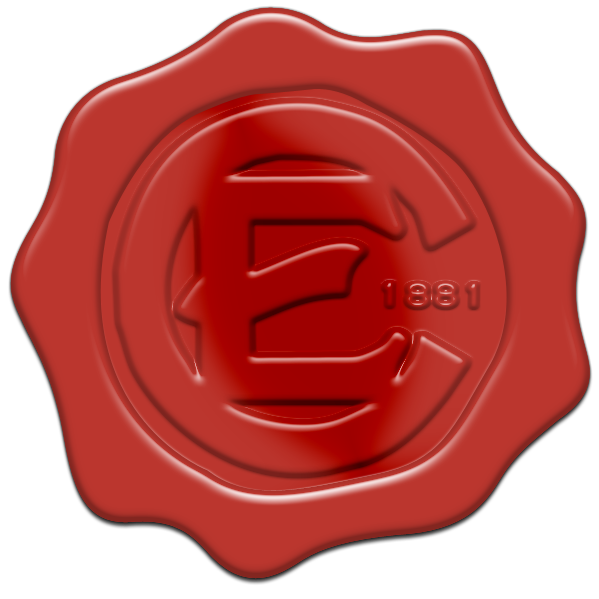
Original CE Logo

The Young People's Society of Christian Endeavor was founded in Portland, Maine, in 1881 by Francis Edward Clark, as an interdenominational Christian youth society encouraging them to "work together to know God in Jesus Christ". Operating internationally as World's Christian Endeavor Union, the society's professed objective is "to promote an earnest Christian life among its members, to increase their mutual acquaintanceship, and to make them more useful in the service of God."

== Formation ==
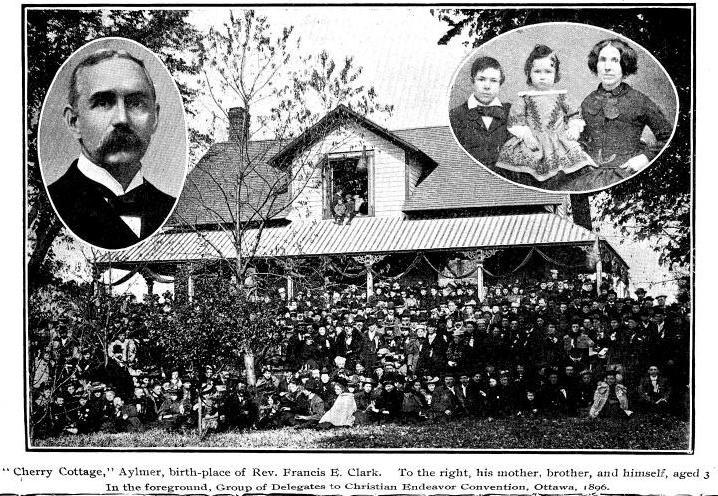
"Cherry Cottage", Aylmer birthplace and family home of Rev. Francis Edward Clark D.D., LL.D 1851–1927. To the right, his mother, brother and himself aged 3. In the foreground, delegates to Christian Endeavor Convention, Ottawa, 1896. Constructed in 1862, the house is listed in the Register of Cultural Heritage of Quebec

Harriet E. Clark, the wife of Rev. Clark, originated the idea of the Society of Christian Endeavor.

The Christian Endeavor movement began on February 2, 1881. After the Society was described in a magazine article in 1882, the Society grew initially in the United States and then spread throughout the British Empire and beyond. The movement peaked during the last decade of the nineteenth century and then declined as denominational youth societies imitated and adapted the forms of Christian Endeavor. The Society continues in various locations into the twenty-first century.

The first Christian Endeavor Society was formed on February 2, 1881, in Portland, Maine, under the direction of Francis E. Clark. Rev. Clark founded the first national church youth organization, Christian Endeavor, the forerunner of the modern denominational "youth fellowship". The society was formed in order to "bring youth to accept Christ and work for Him". The youth were shown that the church cared for young people. The Society enabled youth to express themselves while participating in useful tasks. It stressed a devoted, evangelistic spirit that was expressed in the Christian Endeavor pledge:

Trusting in the Lord Jesus Christ for strength, I promise Him that I will strive to do whatever He would like to have me do; that I will make it the rule of my life to pray and to read the Bible every day, and to support the work and worship of my own church in every way possible; and that just so far as I know how, throughout my whole life, I will endeavor to lead a Christian life. As an active member I promise to be true to all my duties, to be present at and to take some part, aside from singing, in every Christian Endeavor meeting, unless hindered by some reason which I can conscientiously give to my Lord and Master, Jesus Christ. If obliged to be absent from the monthly consecration meeting of the society, I will, if possible, send at least a verse of Scripture to be read in response to my name at the roll call.

Christian Endeavor created publications for youth, devised youth programs, and sponsored events. Christian Endeavor was maintained through private donations that often came from youth.

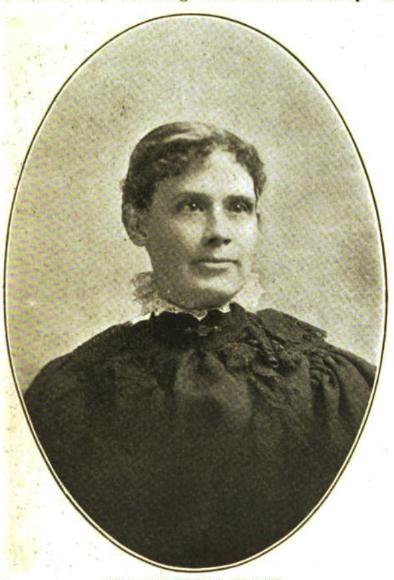
Harriet Clark, originator of the idea of Christian Endeavour

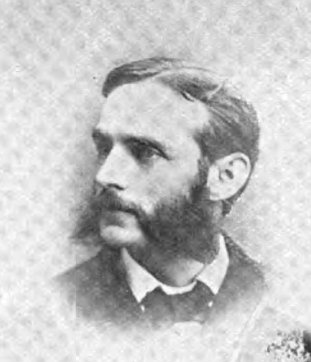
Francis Edward Clark, founder of the Society

Christian Endeavor began as a small group of youth that met at the house of their minister. Within a year, six societies had formed. After two years, the number of societies had grown to fifty-six. The organization expanded rapidly as it grew from a single church society into a world movement. By the end of the 19th century, Christian Endeavor was in the headlines of many major American newspapers. By 1906, 67,000 youth-led Christian Endeavor societies had been organized worldwide, with over four million members. Christian Endeavor took up many causes and was influential in supporting the temperance movement in the 1920s.

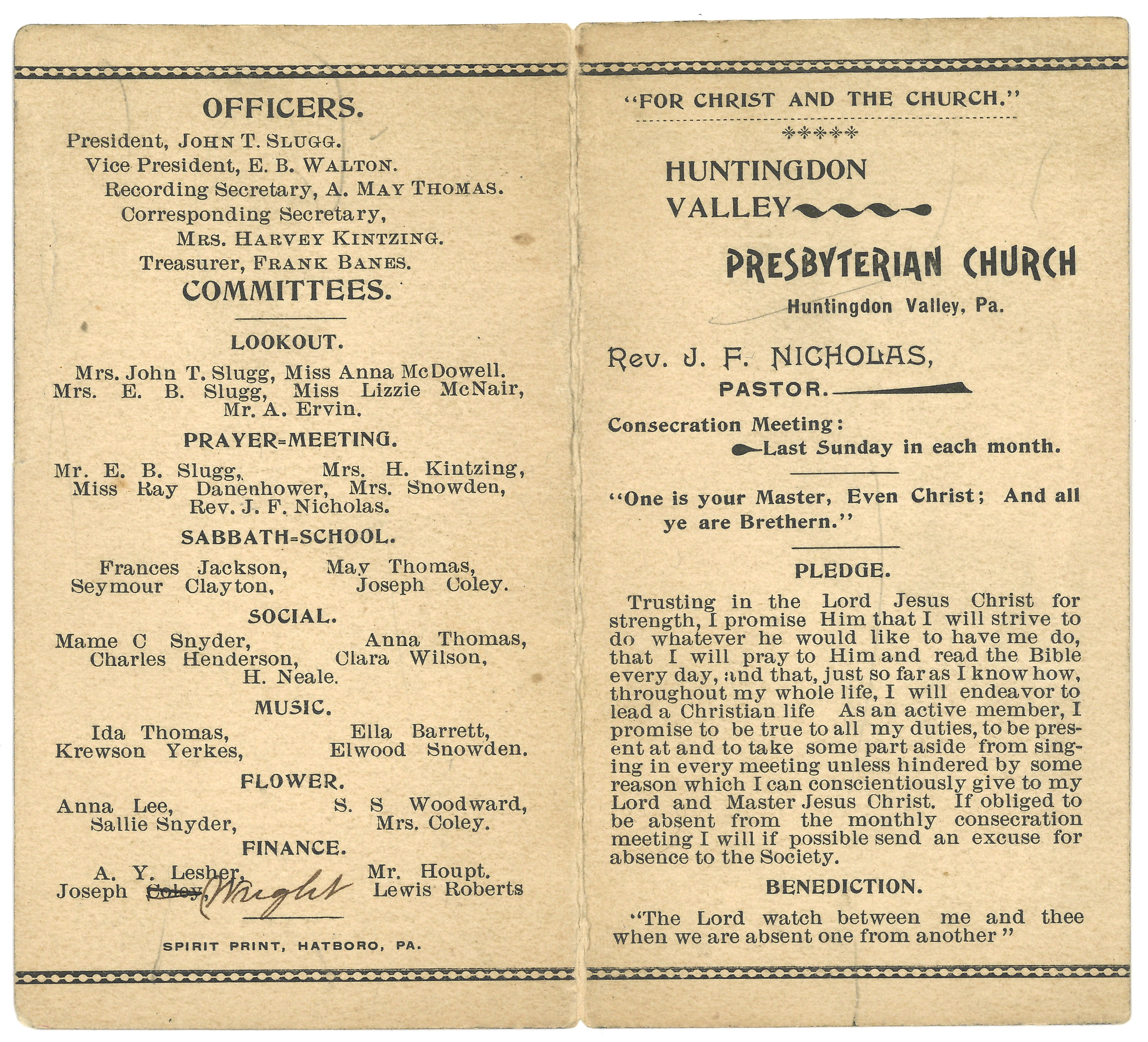
Cover of an 1895 CE pamphlet describing the society's program at Huntingdon Valley Presbyterian Church in Huntingdon Valley, Penna.

Christian Endeavor began extensive publications in 1886. World conventions were held to address major issues. In 1887, Clark was elected president of the United Society, and in 1895 he was chosen as the World President of the Christian Endeavor Union. Clark held this position until his death in 1927. Daniel A. Poling then assumed the presidency. Christian Endeavor societies met at the state level for local control and met in World Conventions at intervals of three to six years. (World Conventions were held in Grand Rapids, Michigan in 1937 and 1951.) The organization's world headquarters moved from Boston, Massachusetts, to Columbus, Ohio, in 1952. Christian Endeavor is still operating throughout the world; their activities are widely reported on international and state Christian Endeavor Websites.

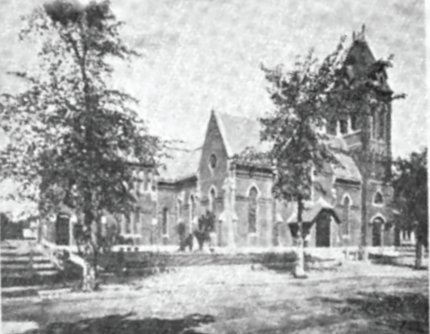
Williston Church in Portland Maine

Drawing on ideas taken from other pastors, especially Presbyterian Theodore L. Cuyler from Brooklyn, Clark shaped the concept of "youth ministry" by asking young people in his Williston Congregational Church to sign a two-sentence pledge described in his book published in 1882, The Children and the Church, and the Young People's Society of Christian Endeavor, as a means of Bringing Them Together. Previously youth had been classified with children and not considered capable of active Christian involvement.

== Modern organization ==
The World's Christian Endeavor Union (WCEU) office is located in Ephrata in Lancaster County, Pennsylvania, USA. The General Secretary (CEO) is Dr. Dave Coryell from the USA. The President is Raffi Masserlian from Lebanon. As of 2022 the society unites 40 independent National Christian Endeavor Unions in 32 countries around the world. According to the WCEU, Christian Endeavor Societies are under development in 20 additional countries.

== Literary references ==
Christian Endeavor meetings are described in both Cloudy Jewel and The Girl from Montana, by Christian author Grace Livingston Hill.

In Heaven to Betsy, the fifth book of the Betsy-Tacy series for children by Maud Hart Lovelace set in 1910s Minnesota, Betsy's new friend Bonnie is the leader of the local Christian Endeavor society, where several characters attend meetings and parties during the course of the novel.
