= John Scudder Sr. =

American missionary (1793–1855)

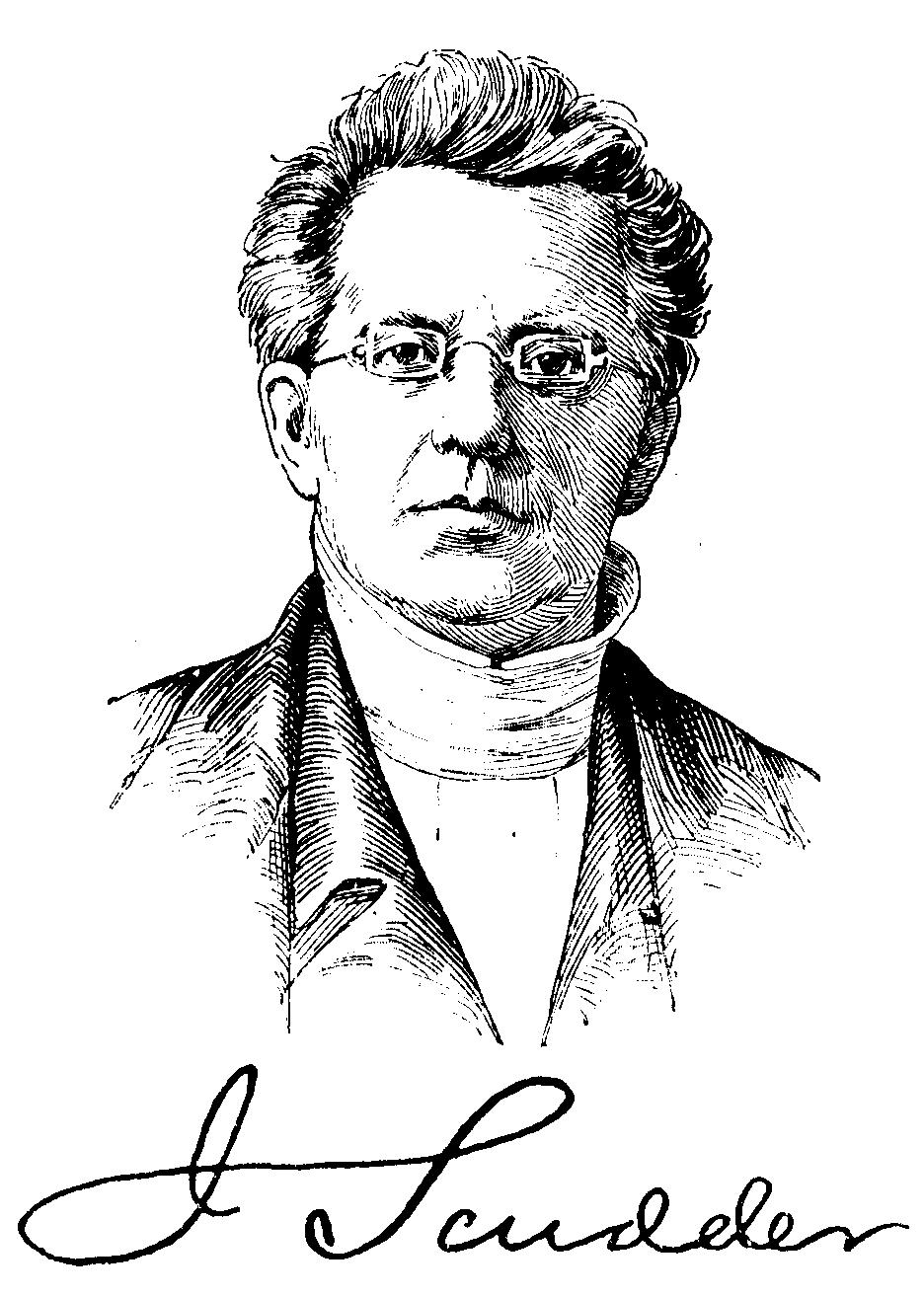

John Scudder Sr. (September 3, 1793 – January 13, 1855) was an American medical doctor and missionary. He founded the first Western Medical Mission in Asia at Ceylon and later became the first American medical missionary in India.

== Early life ==
Scudder was born in Freehold, New Jersey, on September 3, 1793, the son of Joseph (a lawyer) and Maria Scudder. His family was of English descent, with their first ancestor in the Americas being Thomas Scudder, who arrived from England. He graduated from Princeton University in 1811, and the New York College of Physicians and Surgeons in 1813. He practiced successfully in New York City.

One day, while visiting a patient, he saw on a table the pamphlet Conversion of the World, or the Claims of the 600,000,000 and the Ability and Duty of the Churches Respecting Them. It convinced him to become a medical missionary. He and his wife became missionaries of the American Board, and later of the Dutch Reformed Board.

== Ceylon ==
He went to Ceylon in 1819 and was assigned work in the Jaffna District as part of the American Ceylon Mission. He served there for nineteen years in the dual capacity of clergyman and physician. His most important service was the establishment of a large hospital, of which he was physician in chief. He was especially successful in the treatment of cholera and yellow fever. He also founded several native schools and churches including the Batticotta Seminary. Upon leaving Ceylon for India, he turned over the medical missionary leadership at Batticotta to Nathan Ward.

== India ==
In 1836 John Scudder and Rev. Winslow started a mission at Madras with the purpose of establishing a printing press to issue the Scriptures and tracts in the Tamil language. He became the first American medical missionary in India. John Scudder Sr. established his residence at Chintadrepettah (Chintadripet). He was in the United States from 1842 to 1846 and returned to India in 1847, where he spent two years in Madura giving medical aid to the Arcot Mission at the special request of the Board, though not appointed as a member of it. In 1849 Scudder returned to his mission in Madras, where he laboured until his death. He took a visit for the benefit of his health to Wynberg, Cape of Good Hope, Africa, where he died on January 13, 1855. He and his wife Harriet had six surviving sons and two daughters, who all became medical missionaries and worked in South India.

== Evangelism ==
Scudder was one of the most indefatigable distributors of religious tracts that ever came to India.

He published "Letters from the East" (Boston, 1833); "Appeal to Youth in Behalf of the Heathen" (1846); "Letters to Pious Young Men" (1846); "Provision for Passing over Jordan" (New York, 1852), and many tracts and papers that were published in the Missionary Herald. He also gave away almanacs. The tracts were merely an accompaniment to his preaching.

== Legacy ==
Members of the Scudder family have worked as medical missionaries in India and the Middle East for five generations.
