= Christmas in August (Yellowstone) =

Annual tradition in Yellowstone National Park

Christmas in August (formerly known as "Savage Christmas") is an annual tradition in Yellowstone National Park. The celebration includes decorating Christmas trees, singing Christmas carols, and gift exchanges.

== Origin ==
According to the local legend, in the early part of the 20th century a freak blizzard stranded visitors and their stagecoach at the Old Faithful Inn. Rather than lament the fact that they were snowbound in a hotel, the guests decided to celebrate Christmas, since it looked like Christmas outside. Some stories place this blizzard as happening "shortly after the turn of the [20th] century" while others specify the blizzard occurred in 1939 and some place it in the 1920s.

Some stories date the blizzard to the 19th century, prior to the creation of the Old Faithful Inn. There is no historical record recording that a blizzard ever hit Yellowstone on or around August 25 of any given year. In fact, between 1904 and 1941, the most snow that Yellowstone received on any given day in August was 1.8 inches on August 18, 1932. Interviews with older employees indicate that the celebration was not held prior to the 1930s.

== Historical origin ==
While the actual origins to the Christmas in August story are unknown, Yellowstone's Information Specialist Leslie Quinn speculates that the origins are based upon three factors. First, during the 1930s the celebration of Christmas in July was a popular celebration in the Rocky Mountains. Second, August 25th is the anniversary of the National Park Service. Third, there was an existing celebration in the park known as "Savage Days." Quinn discovered a 1966 article published by the Park's Recreation department titled, "Christmas Comes Twice a Year—Once At Home and Once Up Here." In the article, Gene "Mr. Yellowstone Music" Quaw, indicated that there was no Christmas in August celebration while he worked in Yellowstone during the 1920s and 1930s. According to Quaw, there was a small Christmas in July celebration and that the employees would have an employee-only celebration called "Savage Days" wherein a park employee would dress as Santa Claus.

=== Savage Days ===
In 1977, park historian Aubrey L. Haines, indicated that the earliest reference in the 1947 employee handbooks was an indication that read "O. F. Savages held annual celebration, 7/25." According to the August 1, 1947, issue of Yellowstone's Weekly News the July 25th celebration had nothing to do with Christmas. "The 'savages' (concessionaire employees) at Old Faithful held a gala affair on July 25 known as "Savage Day." Several floats were entered in the long parade up the main street at Old Faithful. The day concluded with a large masquerade ball in the evening." Haines indicates that he remembered the celebrations going back to 1939 when he worked at Old Faithful as an Assistant District Ranger, but that nobody paid the employee-only celebration much attention.

By 1953, however, the annual celebration known as "savage days" had become a parkwide celebration and had attracted the attention of the park concessioners and National Park Service as it interfered with service quality.

=== Savage Christmas ===
1953 was the last year "Savage Days" were celebrated in Yellowstone National Park. Starting in 1954, the park concessionaires made a concerted effort to merge Savage Days with the smaller "Christmas in July" celebration. Trevor Povah, the head of Hamilton Stores, one of the park concessioners claims that the park concessioners deliberately created the story of a blizzard at the Old Faithful Inn to obfuscate the origins of a new celebration called "Savage Christmas." In 1955, the first publications came out mentioning "Savage Christmas." From 1954–59, the celebration was held either on July 25 or August 25, but by 1959 August 25 became the permanent date. Quinn speculates that there were two reasons why the August 25 date prevailed over the July 25 one. First, the tourist season in Yellowstone starts in May and ends at the end of August; by celebrating Christmas on August 25, it became an end-of-the-tourist-season celebration. Second, Warren Ost, a bellhop at the Old Faithful Inn and founder of A Christian Ministry in the National Parks (ACMNP), had started a choir. The choir held its first celebration on August 7, 1949. Within two years, ACMNP was forming choirs at the Old Faithful, Mammoth Hot Springs, and Lake areas of the park with the intention of performing Handel's Messiah. Quinn reasons that having the Messiah, which was an annual tradition from the early 1950s through the 1990s, coincide with the Christmas celebration would have been a logical step. "But with only a short season in which to prepare, an August date for the concert would have been more reasonable, and this may have been a factor in the July-to- August switch." Delmar J. Sicard, III, the author who wrote the article "Christmas Comes Twice A Year—Once At Home And Once Up Here" noted that the Christmas celebrations "began to take on a more serious and formal aspect" with the arrival of ACMNP serminarians.
