= Madison Avenue Presbyterian Church =

Church in Manhattan, New York

Coordinates: 40.772490°N 73.964489°W

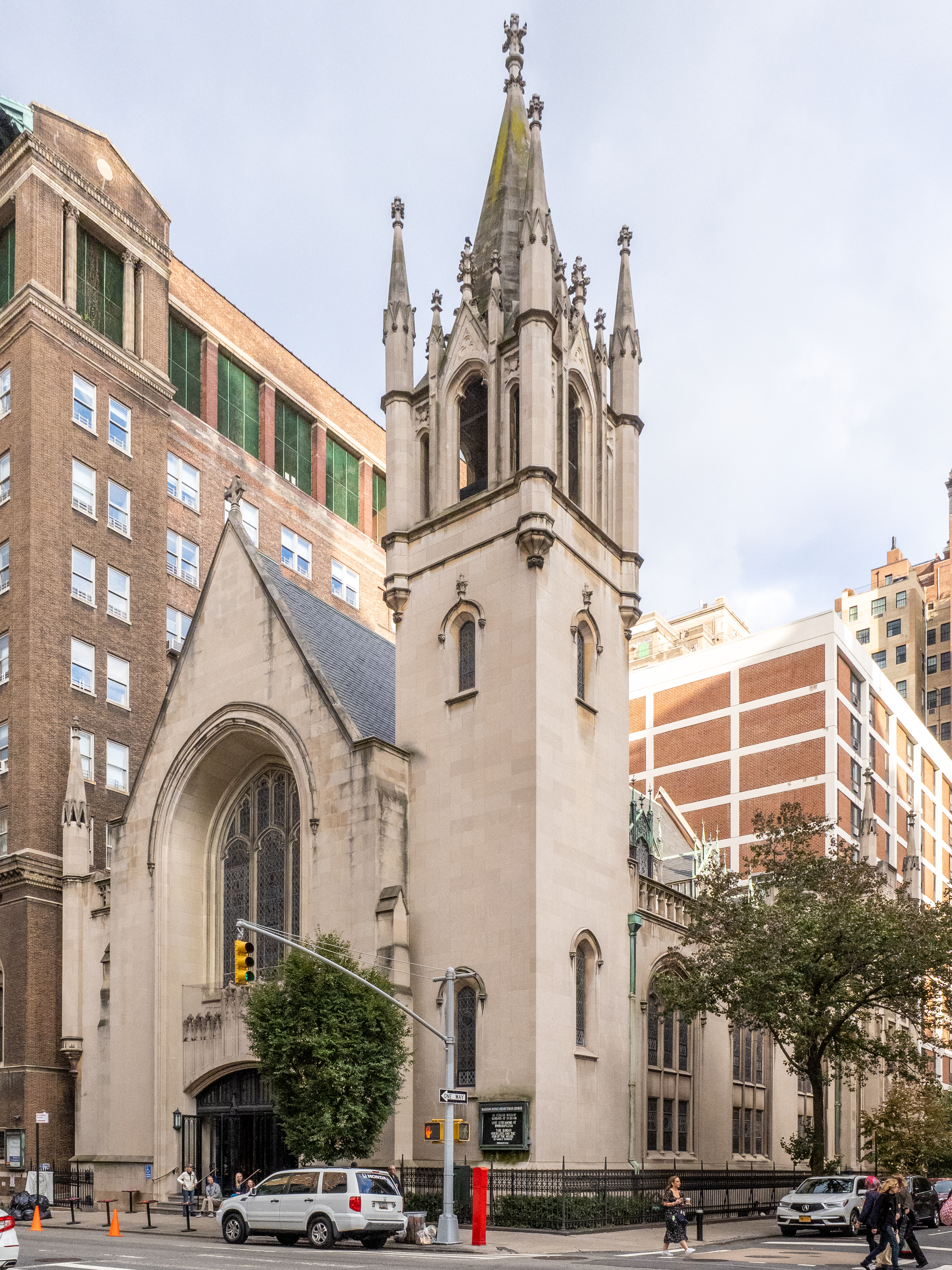
- The church in 2021
- Madison Avenue Presbyterian Church
- Location: New York City, New York
- Country: United States
- Denomination: Presbyterian Church (USA)
- Website: mapc.com

History
- Status: Church
- Founded: 1839

Architecture
- Functional status: Active
- Architect: James E. Ware & Sons
- Style: Neo-Gothic
- Completed: 1899

Administration
- Parish: Madison Avenue

Madison Avenue Presbyterian Church (MAPC) is a congregation of the Presbyterian Church (USA). It is located at East 73rd Street and Madison Avenue on the Upper East Side of Manhattan in New York City.

== History ==
The congregation was organized in 1839 as Eleventh Presbyterian Church on 4th and Avenue D. The church moved to East 53rd and Madison Avenue in 1872 and changed its name to Memorial Presbyterian Church in commemoration of the Old and New School branches of the denomination. The congregation was renamed Madison Avenue Presbyterian Church in 1886.

Phillips Presbyterian Church was organized in 1844 and moved uptown in 1869. In 1872, James Lenox donated a church building, designed in High Victorian Gothic style by R.H. Robertson, on the East 73rd Street site. In 1899, Madison Avenue Presbyterian Church merged with Phillips and the church building was redesigned in a neo-Gothic style by James E. Ware. The current location has an 800-seat sanctuary.

In 1927, George Arthur Buttrick succeeded Henry Sloane Coffin as minister. In January 1936, he officiated the wedding of future President Donald Trump's parents, Fred Trump and Mary Anne MacLeod Trump, in this church. Writer Frederick Buechner attended MAPC and was eventually ordained there in 1958.

David H. C. Read was pastor of MAPC from 1956 until 1989. During Read's tenure, his sermons were mailed out each Monday as part of a subscription service, and some of his regular radio sermons were broadcast nationally by the National Council of Churches. Read was succeeded by Fred R. Anderson.

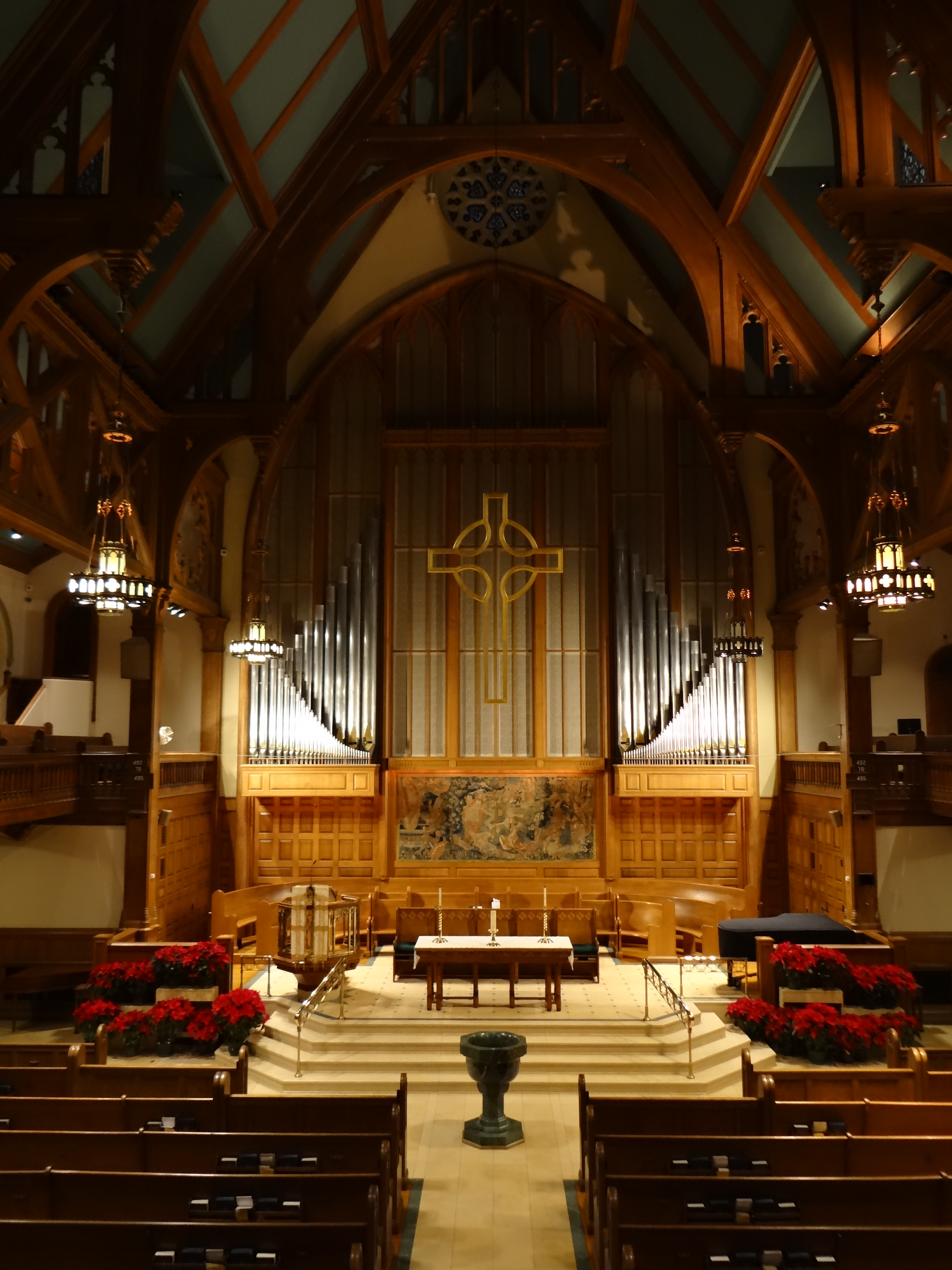
The church's nave

== Notable members ==
- Mary Boone, art dealer and collector
- Frederick Buechner, author and theologian
- Andrew Carnegie, industrialist and philanthropist
- Robert Searle, associate minister
- Lin Yutang, Chinese writer
- Warren Ost, minister and founder of A Christian Ministry in the National Parks
