= Camp Taiga =

Historic camp in Long Lake, New York, US

- U.S. National Register of Historic Places
- Camp Taiga photographed prior to 1909
- Location: 52 Mattson Way, Long Lake, New York
- Coordinates: 43.9936°N 74.4099°W
- Built: c. 1890s
- NRHP reference No.: 100001068
- Added to NRHP: June 12, 2017

Camp Taiga is a small vacation cabin in the Adirondack Mountains of New York state. It is located on the western shore of Long Lake in the town of the same name. Camp Taiga includes a 700-square-foot (65 m^{2}) log cabin that dates to the 1890s and a mid-20th-century bunkhouse, as well as other non-contributing structures. The cabin's interior dates to c. 1903–09 and is notable for features common at much larger Great Camps, including birch bark wallpaper and a large stone fireplace. Camp Taiga remains privately owned and has been listed on the National Register of Historic Places since 2017.

== Site ==
The camp is located on the western shore of Long Lake, accessible both by boat from the hamlet of Long Lake and by car from Kickerville Road. The heavily wooded lot is approximately 0.75 acres (0.30 ha). The cabin is located on a small rise 100 feet (30 m) from the shoreline. In addition to the bunkhouse and cabin, the site includes a storage shed and well house that do not contribute to the camp's historic character.

== Architecture ==
The rectangular 700-square-foot (65 m^{2}) features a gable roof and three additions: a kitchen, a screened porch and a bathroom. The main structure of the cabin was built with unpeeled split logs, set palisade-style against a log frame. The roof features asphalt shingles over cedar shakes. The foundation is loose stone. The southeast side of the cabin faces Long Lake and features a full-width porch, with two windows flanking a central door. Decorative porch railings visible in early photographs have been replaced. The northeast and southwest gable ends of the cabin feature slanted logs as decoration. The southwest gable end also includes a screened porch addition accessed only from indoors, while the bathroom was added on the northeast side. The northwest rear side includes the kitchen and dining area additions. A fieldstone chimney is located on this side between the original cabin and kitchen addition. A 1950s bunkhouse on the site also contributes to the camp's historic character. It features a hip roof and includes a screened porch and bathroom and exterior of board and batten.

The original cabin interior likely included only a living room, bedroom and loft. By 1909, the open area above the living room had been enclosed to create another bedroom. The stone fireplace is the dominant feature of the living room. The walls of the cabin interior feature unpeeled log corner posts and rafters, birch bark wallpaper on the upper walls, separated by a log chair rail from rough cedar bark paneling below. The cabin is decorated with elements common in Adirondack camps, including American Indian imagery and animal trophies.

== History ==
Camp Taiga was constructed between 1890 and 1903. (Note: Earlier estimates of its construction are based on local tax and property records, while the 1903 date is based on a pictorial published in Suburban Life magazine in 1909.) Its palisade-style construction with vertical logs was common in that region of the Adirondacks in the late 19th century since it allowed the use of smaller and non-matching timber. The cabin was likely constructed by a Long Lake guide to accommodate "sports" who visited the region for hunting and fishing. It was sold to a family from New York City as a vacation camp in 1903, who added the rustic interior decor, kitchen and screened porch before selling it in 1909. The camp was featured in Suburban Life in 1909. Ownership changed hands several times over the coming years until 1925, when Camp Taiga was bought by Elizabeth Havens, a Rockefeller family relative who owned the larger neighboring Camp Kee-o-nekh. Havens upgraded the kitchen and owned Camp Taiga until 1957. Her heir sold Camps Kee-o-nekh and Taiga to Presbyterian minister and Long Lake summer resident Robert Searle, who added the bathroom and built the driveway to Kickerville Road. After Searle's death in 1967, his wife separated the properties and sold Camp Taiga to its present private owner.

== Preservation ==
Camp Taiga was added to the National Register of Historic Places in 2017. At the time, the head of preservation organization Adirondack Architectural Heritage said that Camp Taiga was "a fine example of a small highly decorated Adirondack rustic camp which uses design elements associated with much larger Adirondack rustic camps—a large stone fireplace, birch bark wall coverings, unpeeled logs and trim, Native American images and artifacts, animal trophies, and (originally) a roof open to the rafters."
