= First Church in Albany =

Historic church in New York, United States

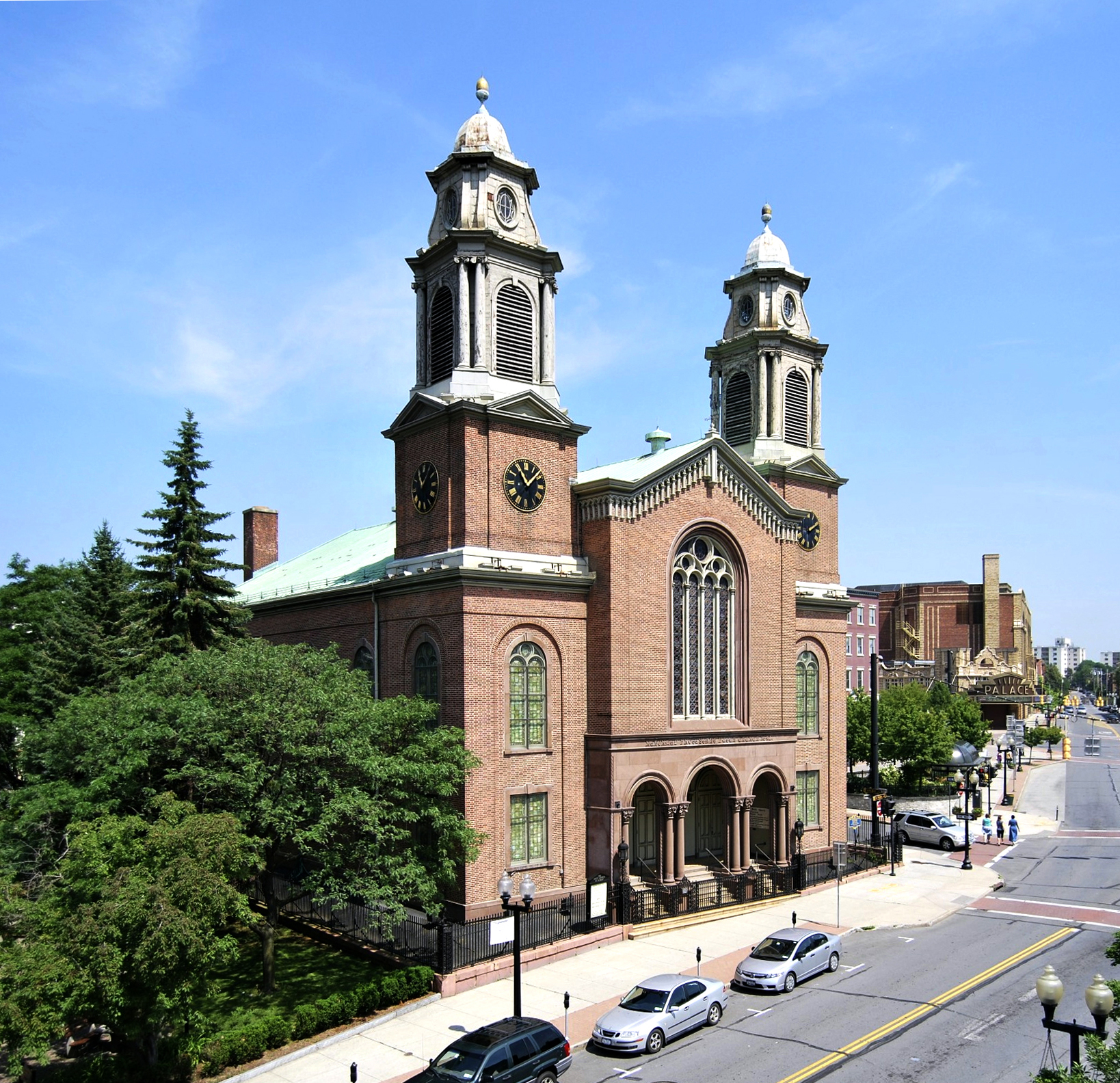
- First Church in Albany in 2010

Religion
- Affiliation: Reformed Church in America
- Leadership: Rev. Dr. Mashona Walston

Location
- Location: Albany, New York, U.S.
- Interactive map of First Church in Albany
- Coordinates: 42°39′13″N 73°45′2″W

Architecture
- Architect: Philip Hooker
- Groundbreaking: 1789
- Completed: 1797-1799

Specifications
- Direction of façade: East
- Length: 116 feet (35 m)
- Width: 70 feet (21 m)
- Spire: 2
- Materials: Brick, stone

U.S. National Register of Historic Places
- Added to NRHP: January 21, 1974
- NRHP Reference no.: 74001214

Website
- The First Church in Albany

The First Reformed Church, also known as First Church in Albany or North Dutch Church, is located at North Pearl (New York State Route 32) and Orange streets in Albany, New York, United States. It is a member congregation of the Reformed Church in America. The building was designed by Philip Hooker and built in the period of 1797–1799. It was listed on the National Register of Historic Places in 1974.

It was established in 1642 to serve the Dutch inhabitants of Fort Orange, the adjacent village of Beverwyck and the patroonship of Rensselaerswyck in general. It is the second oldest congregation in the state of New York and the oldest upstate. The current church, designed by Philip Hooker, is the fourth building and the oldest church in Albany. The pulpit was imported from the Netherlands in 1656 and is the oldest pulpit in the United States.

Shortly after construction, a memorial service was held for Alexander Hamilton. Theodore Roosevelt, who was raised in the Dutch Reformed Church, attended services here while Governor, and Queen Wilhelmina visited the church during its 300th anniversary year. The church has been through many renovations since it was built.

== Building ==
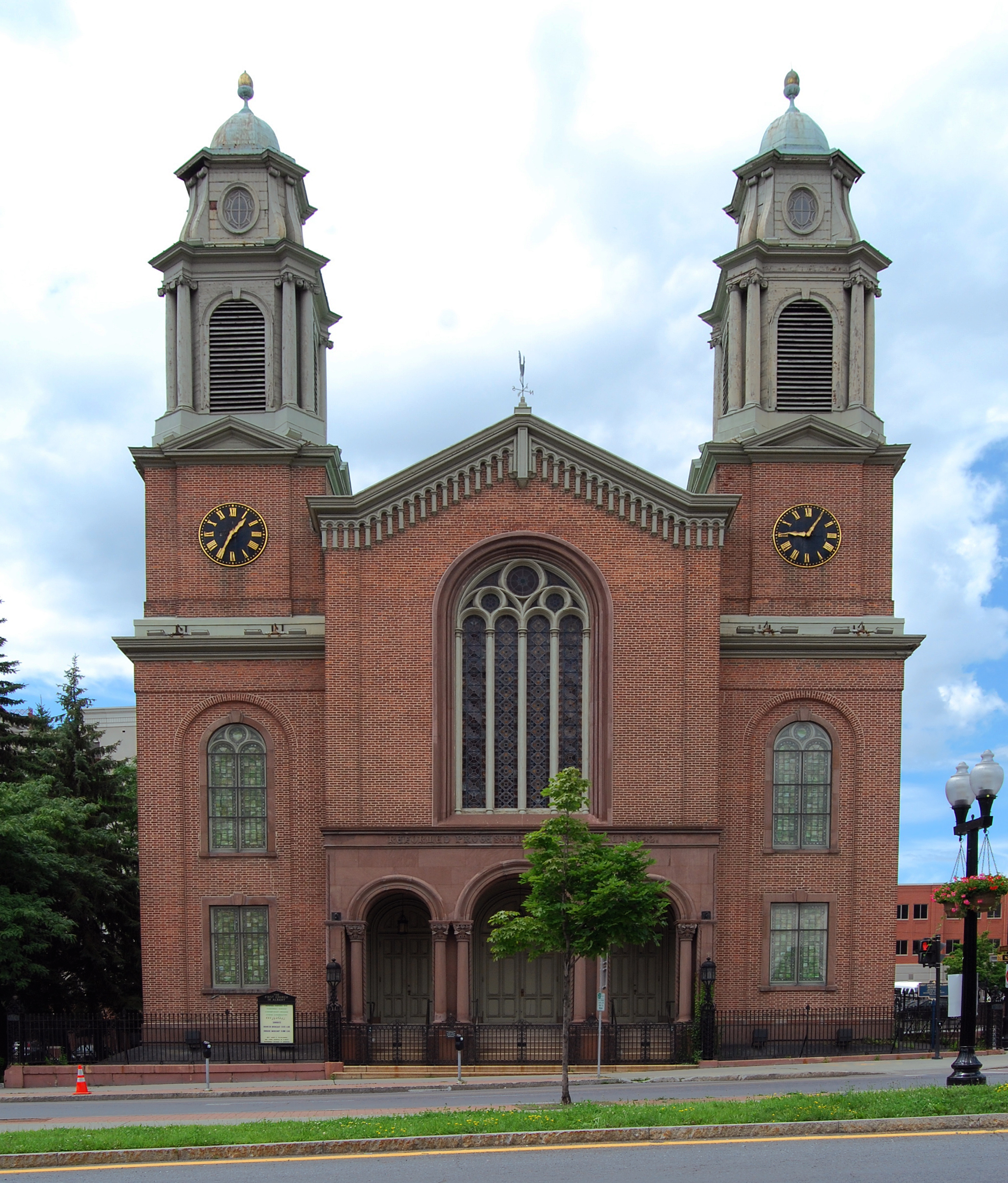
Front of First Church(RCA)

The church is located at the southwest corner of the intersection a few blocks north of downtown Albany. The terrain slopes very gently towards the Hudson River 1,000 ft (300 m) to the east, and more sharply upwards to the southwest and northwest, reflecting the ravine that gave the nearby Sheridan Hollow neighborhood its name. Open space begins to break up the urban fabric here, in contrast to the denser development of downtown.

On its north is Clinton Square, the southern and eastern end of the Clinton Avenue Historic District, also listed on the National Register. The only contributing property to that district also listed individually on the Register, the Palace Theatre, is a block to the north, across Clinton (U.S. Route 9). To the northeast is Wallenburg Park, filling the block between North Pearl, Clinton, Broadway and Orange. Across North Pearl is a small grassy traffic island separating Orange and the onramps to Interstate 787, which runs along the river. Some high-rises, including the headquarters of the state's Department of Environmental Conservation, are located next to the freeway. On the south is the church's parking lot.

The building itself is constructed of brick laid in Flemish bond, except for the portion on the front of the main block, laid in stretcher bond. In some places the bricks are three and a half rows deep. The church is six bays wide and two stories high. The east (front) facade is topped on either side by identical three-stage towers.

All windows on that facade, on the two stories of the towers and the larger one in the center of the main block, are stained glass, trimmed with stone. The tripartite main entrance has a stone face and arcade of three round arches supported by smooth columns with Corinthian capitals. Behind them the actual entryways are recessed. At the top of the stone there is a decorative cornice with "Reformed Dutch Church 1642" carved into it.

Above the central window is another decorative cornice along the gabled roofline, corbeled by a miniature version of the arcade. At the apex of the gable is a weathervane. The roof itself is clad in copper.

The two windows in the lower section of each tower are themselves slightly recessed in a round arch laid in splayed brick. Atop the arch is a single string course of projecting brick. A simpler molded cornice sets off the beginning of the towers.

The first stage of the towers has a slightly projecting central section, topped by a pediment, on each of its two outward faces, with a large clock in the center. Above it is a metal section with two smooth Ionic columns in the corners and a round-arched louvered vent with a keystone. Broad overhanging eaves set off the next section, the base of the cupola, with a shingled face and oculus. Above another set of eaves is a small domed top with an acorn-shaped finial.

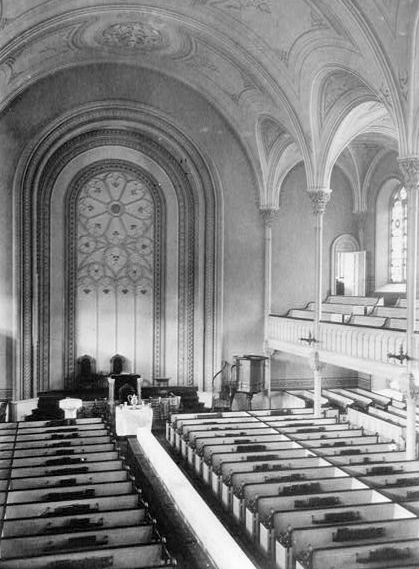
Historic American Buildings Survey photo of interior ca. 1937

Inside the arcade motif continues. Corinthian columns support the ribbed vaulted ceilings, and a smaller arcade of five round arches with gilded tracery sets off the west wall of the chancel. To the west there is no apse, just a wing with offices, vestry and lecture rooms.

== History ==
After Henry Hudson explored the river that would be named after him in 1609, his employer, the Dutch government, began colonizing the valley as New Netherland. The capital, Fort Orange, its boundaries roughly corresponding to Albany's present downtown, was established as far upriver as possible in order to strengthen the Dutch claim to the area. In 1624 the Dutch East India Company appointed someone to perform informal religious services for the settlers in the vicinity of the fort.

The church itself was formally organized in 1642. A minister was called, elders and deacons were elected. Services were first held in the manor house of the local patroon, the Van Rensselaer family, then a converted warehouse and a log cabin. In 1656 the first dedicated church building, was built on the property of Jan Coster Van Auken adjoining his shop at what is now the steam boat landing, a stone structure was erected. It was referred to as "the blockhouse" because it doubled as a defensive structure in case of attack. The weathervane from that building graced the church's roof for many years; today it is in the church's archives, with a copy in its place.

In 1664, following the First Anglo-Dutch War, King Charles II of Great Britain had New Netherland seized. The settlement around the fort was renamed Albany. Worship continued unimpeded at the church, even as the Dutch briefly assumed control of the colony again during the Third Anglo-Dutch War. In 1686, the city was incorporated under British sovereignty as the capital of the Province of New York. Its founding document, the Dongan Charter, gave the church title to the pastures then south of the city as partial payment for a loan; the church rented the lots out to local farmers.

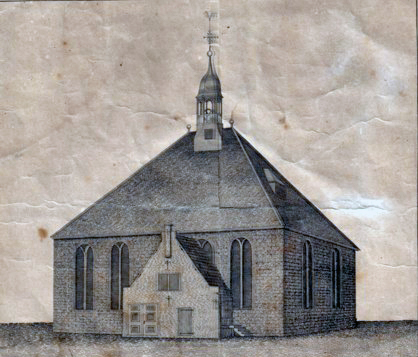
The 1715 church

Three years later the church began its mission to the Mohawks, the Native American tribe in the area. It continued for almost 50 years and baptized over 300 converts. In 1715 the church built a larger, hip-roofed stone church around the blockhouse church, then dismantled the older building.

Five years later the church was formally incorporated itself, as the Reformed Protestant Dutch Church in the City of Albany. A half-century later, as the Revolution loomed, the church was among the founding members of the independent synod that later became today's Reformed Church in America (RCA). As the American colonies followed the church's lead and fought for their independence from Britain, the church held prayer meetings and opened its doors to serve as a hospital for troops of the Continental Army injured at the Battle of Saratoga.

In 1782, as the war was ending with American independence a certain outcome, General George Washington visited the church's consistory to personally thank them for their support. Around the same time, the church began holding its first services in English, which would totally overtake Dutch as its liturgical language within eight years. It would be part of the Classis of Albany established in 1785.

Two years later, the church began to divest itself of the pasturelands south of the city, opening them up to development. In 1789, the process of building the current church began. Philip Hooker, a local carpenter's son who had been establishing himself as an architect in the Albany area, was commissioned to design it. It took several years to get construction going on Hooker's first major work, delayed by punch list items like changing the roof cladding from shingles to copper and altering the cupola design. In 1798, a few months before the $25,000 ($474,000 in modern dollars) project was completed and opened for services, one of Albany's newspapers called it "a superb and elegant building."

Hooker's Georgian design featured graceful pediments and grouped columns. He may have based it on Charles Bulfinch's Hollis Street Church in Boston. When built it was just the main block, and a simpler front entrance. The windows were set with plain leaded glass.

The 1715 church was sold to the city and demolished in 1806. Its handcarved pulpit was preserved and reused in the new church. Five years later a second church building was completed and opened on Beaver Street, known as the South Dutch Church. In 1815 it incorporated separately as the Second Reformed Protestant Dutch Church.

In 1830, the church was expanded with a new wing on the rear. Hooker, in his sixties, was consulted by John Boardman, the architect of the expansion. Included with the plans is a memorandum from him with a sketch. The expanded wing housed lecture rooms and a consistory.

The 1850s were an important decade for the church. In 1854 the last vestiges of its colonial past ended with the sale of the remaining pasturelands. Two years later a board of trustees was established to manage the church. Finally, in 1858, another renovation and expansion took place.

This renovation was more extensive and visibly changed the church. The Romanesque front was added and the windows changed to stained glass. Inside the vaulted ceiling was added, as well an enlarged organ. Central heating and new lecture rooms were also added.

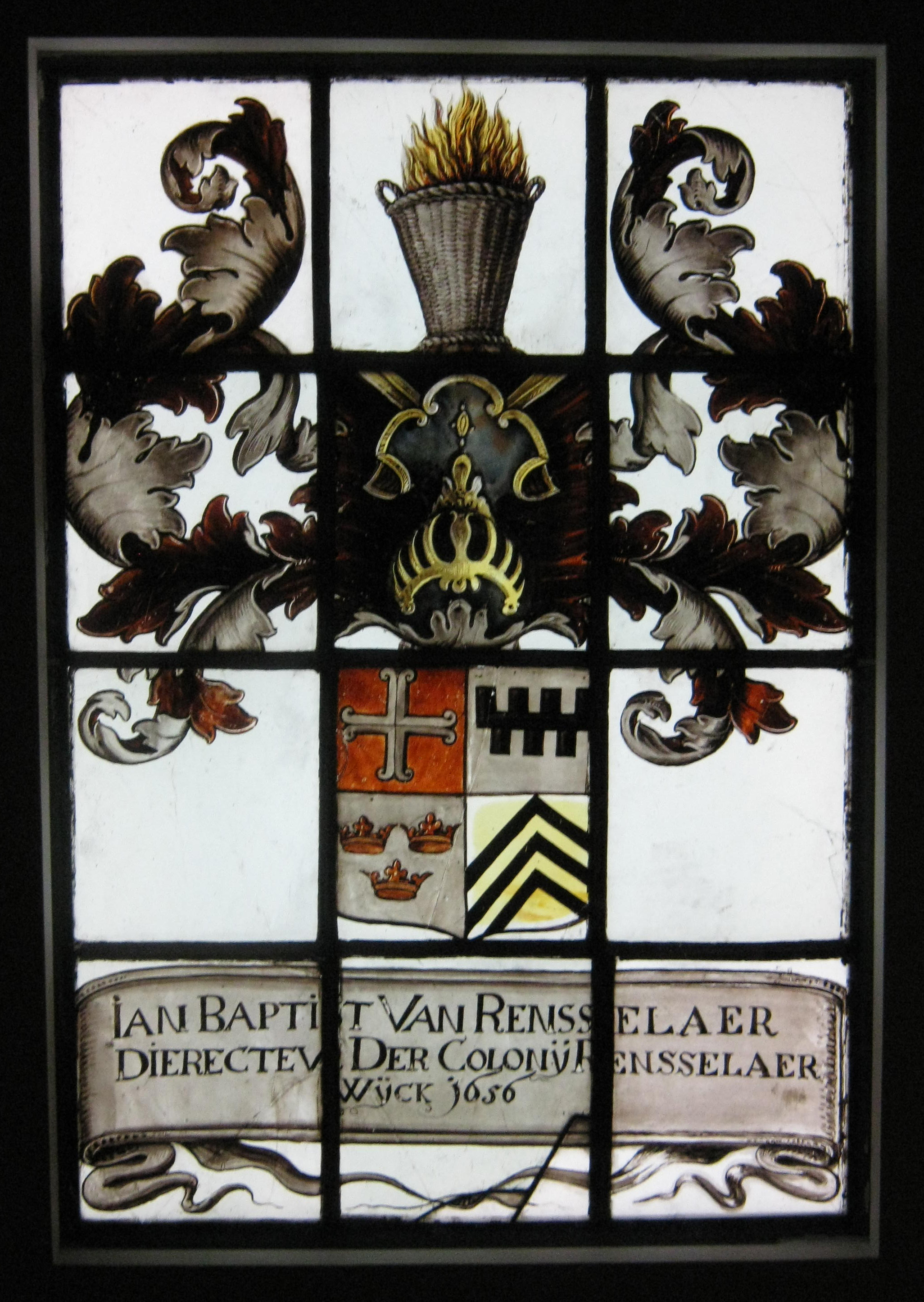
stained glass of the church

At the beginning of the 20th century, in 1903, the church sent a missionary to India. She began programs there that continued for almost 50 years. A decade later the interior was redecorated following plans by Tiffany Studios. Green stained glass windows were added, along with green stenciling on the walls, new chancel woodwork and a wood-glass screen in the rear.

In 1918, the church began some changes in its governance. The elders, deacons and trustees all jointly approved its first annual budget. This paved the way for the church to merge with the Second Dutch Church 20 years later, making them a single organization again after over a century apart, now known as the First Church in Albany. To accommodate the combined congregations, the old lecture hall was replaced with a new parish house the next year.

The work did not stop there. In 1940 the interior was again redecorated. The sanctuary was repainted, a dark red oak reredos installed in the chancel, and the choir loft widened. On the outside the walls were sandblasted, the towers widened and the roof redone. Thus renewed, the church welcomed then-exiled Queen Wilhelmina for its 300th anniversary celebration in 1942. After World War II, the interior improvements continued with a new organ, a large four-manual built by Austin Organs Inc.

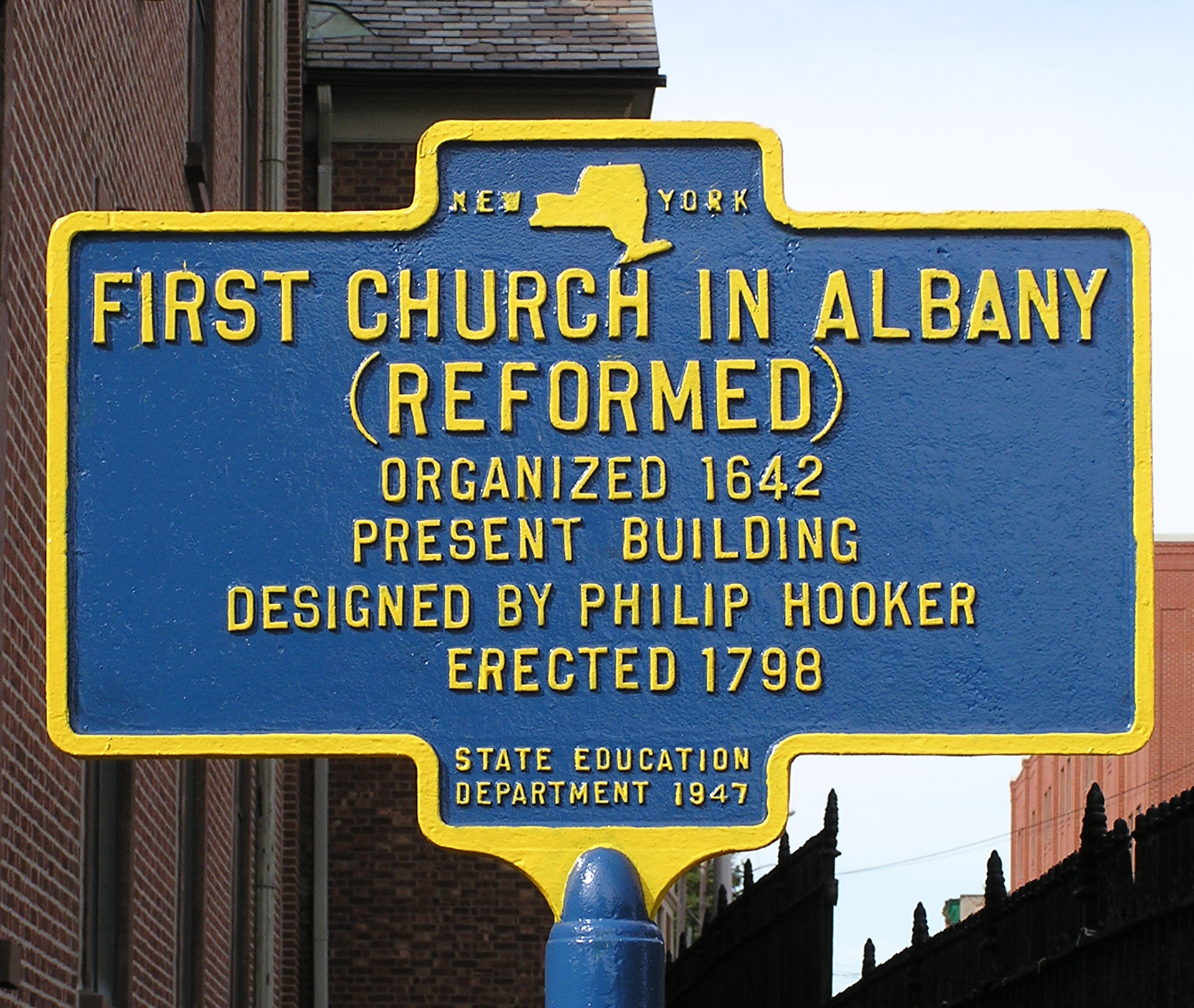
First Church in Albany historical marker

In the ensuing decades changes in the city, and society, led to more changes in the church. Throughout the 1960s and '70s it bought the neighboring lots to use as parking for congregants who now lived outside the city. Some was set aside for use as a small urban park. In 1973, after changes in the RCA's Book of Church Order permitted it, the first female elder and deacon were elected. The next year Clee Park was dedicated as the church marked its National Register listing, and summer drive-in worship, in which attendees remain in their cars while the minister conducts services from an outdoor pulpit, began.

Renovations have taken place since then. In 1988 the parish house would be expanded with new offices, a lobby and an elevator. With these completed, the church was able to celebrate its 350th anniversary in 1992 by hosting the RCA's General Synod.

== Programs and services ==
The church holds an hour-long service every Sunday morning, followed by an hour of coffee and conversation. In the summertime a drive-in service is held, and afterwards there is a "lemonade lull."

Every Monday and Wednesday the church operates a food pantry. Food and other grocery items made available to those in need are donated at services by members of the congregation. It is supplemented by special programs for children around the end-of-year holidays. Congregants also take part in the annual CROP walk for world hunger.

For our children ages 9 – 12, the church offers the 9Up Ministry. Children come together while their families are in worship 3 out of 4 Sundays to work on liturgical art projects. They learn the seasons of the church, the importance of art in worship, and their responsibilities as members of a church congregation.

Some support organizations use church facilities. Alcoholics Anonymous meets in the church parlor once a week.

The church supports some international efforts with special collections at Christmas and Easter. Along with other RCA churches, First Church supports Global Mission (RCA) who have partners world-wide providing ministry to people in need, relief in disaster areas, and community partnership with indigenous peoples.

== Notable members ==
- Theodore Roosevelt
- Albert Janse Ryckman
- Robert Searle

== See also ==
- Dutch Reformed Church
- History of Albany, New York
- National Register of Historic Places listings in Albany, New York
