= David H. C. Read =

- Born: 2 January 1910; Cupar, Fife Scotland
- Died: 7 January 2001 (aged 91); New York City, U.S.
- Citizenship: Scottish
- Occupation: Minister
- Spouse: Patricia Read

Reverend Doctor David Haxton Carswell Read, B.D. D.D. (2 January 1910 – 7 January 2001) was a Scottish Presbyterian clergyman and author who served as Senior Minister at the Madison Avenue Presbyterian Church in New York City, New York from 1956 to 1989. He also served as the first Chaplain of the University of Edinburgh from 1949 to 1955 and as "Chaplain to Her Majesty the Queen in Scotland" from 1952 to 1956.

Read was also taken prisoner by the Germans while serving as Chaplain to the 51st Highland Division of the British Army during World War II. He gained significant recognition for his book, published 1944, entitled Prisoners' Quest, about his experiences in the German POW camps.

== Books by David H. C. Read ==
- Prisoners' quest : a presentation of the Christian faith in a prisoners of war camp, 1944
- The Christian Faith, 1956
- I am Persuaded, 1961
- Sons of Anak: The Gospel and the Modern Giants, 1964
- The Pattern of Christ, 1967
- Christian Ethics, 1968
- Religion without Wrappings, 1970
- Overheard, 1971
- Curious Christians, 1973
- Expanding Faith, 1973
- Sent from God: The Enduring Power and Mystery of Preaching, 1974
- Go & Make Disciples, 1978
- Unfinished Easter: Sermons on the Ministry, 1978
- The Faith Is Still There, 1981
- This Grace Given, 1984
- Grace Thus Far, 1986
- God Was in the Laughter: The Autobiography of David Haxton Carswell Read, 2005
- Virginia Wolf Meets Charlie Brown, 1968
- Good News in the Letters of Paul, 1975
- Preaching About the Needs of Real People, 1988
- The Presence of Christ, 1968
- Faith Without Fanaticism: What Churches Have to Offer 1987
- Whose God is Dead, 1966
- Holy Common Sense, 1966
- Christmas Tales for All Ages, 1989
- The Communication of the Gospel, 1952
- God's Mobile Family, 1966
