= Charles Limbert =

American furniture designer

- Born: Charles Potter Limbert; 1854
- Died: 1923 (aged 68–69); Grand Rapids Michigan
- Occupation: Furniture designer
- Organization(s): Limbert's Holland Dutch Arts & Crafts Furniture
- Known for: Mission Furniture
- Movement: American Arts & Crafts Movement
- Father: Levi H. Limbert
- Relatives: Clara T. Limbert

Charles P. Limbert (1854–1923) was an American furniture designer. He is considered one of the most successful furniture leaders in the history of Grand Rapids and the Arts and Crafts movement in America. The furniture that bears his name is highly sought after and seriously collected to this day. His designs were mainly inspired by such diverse influences as English Arts and Crafts, Dutch folk furniture, Scottish architect/designer Charles Rennie Mackintosh, and the Vienna Secession.

== Early Days ==
Limbert was born in Linesville, Pennsylvania, in 1854, the son of cabinetmaker and furniture dealer Levi H. Limbert. After moving with his family in 1866 to Akron, Ohio, he later learned the furniture business in the 1870s at his father's store. As a young man in Akron, the first business he tried on his own was in the carriage trade.

== Career ==
After leaving Akron, Limbert moved to Chicago (where he worked as a salesman at Colbys Furniture Store), then to Grand Rapids, Michigan, where he set up his permanent business location at the newly built Blodgett building in 1889. After several major collaborations in that city, such as the “Klingman & Limbert Chair Co.” and his own furniture selling commission called “Charles P. Limbert & Co.”, he opened his own name brand company, the “Charles P. Limbert Furniture Co.” in Grand Rapids in 1902, and his own custom built factory in Holland, Michigan, in 1906, where his entourage designed and built "Limbert's Holland Dutch Arts and Crafts Furniture". Limbert continued to manage his company until 1922, when poor health prompted him to sell his share in the company. In 1942, the Charles P. Limbert Company was declared bankrupt on January 2, and the factory closed its doors on January 22. The factory and machinery went up for public auction September 16.

== Factory Locations ==
Limbert originally started producing furniture in Grand Rapids at a variety of unknown locations, before finally securing their factory at the south west corner of Butterworth and Front, which was previously owned by the Clipper Bicycle Co. After 1906, they made furniture in their own brand new and customized factory in Holland Michigan, built at the south east corner of Sixth and Columbia.

== Entourage ==
Although Limbert himself was known as an artist and expert in furniture design, the success of his company also revolved around his entourage of designers who helped create his lines. The most influential designers who worked with Limbert during his arts and crafts era of production were the Gohlke family. Louis F. Gohlke (hired in 1902) designed the Limbert logo brand, and his son William J. Gohlke (hired in 1908) designed a variety advertisements, catalogue covers and watercolor interiors. In 1917 Limbert hired Charles D. Thompson, who had a reputation for his work in London, to design a variety of period styles.

== Social Life ==
Charles P. Limbert lived with his sister Clara T. in an antique Victorian mansion with arts and crafts style improvements, in Grand Rapids at Fisk Lake. They were two of the wealthiest and most predominant citizens in the history of the city. They were members of a vast variety of social clubs, and regular hosts to parties and events at their home and grounds. These events were repeatedly publicized and reviewed in the local newspapers.

== Limberts By Van Raalte ==
At the end of 1922, the Charles P. Limbert Furniture Co. changed into new ownership and management, although technically remaining in control of people who were already established there. W.J. Gohlke took on the role of vice president, and the Limbert brand logo was modified to include the name Van Raalte, as D.B.K. Van Raalte (the grandson of the founder of Holland) stepped up within several important roles in the company, from superintendent manager, eventually to the president and leader for the next two decades.

== Identification ==
The official trademark of Limbert Furniture is a small rounded edge vertical rectangle shape with an image of a craftsman using a woodworking table, with the words “Limberts Arts Crafts Furniture Trademark” written amidst the image. While in Grand Rapids, from 1902 to 1906, the company applied this logo in a paper label form, which also stated “Made in Grand Rapids Michigan” at the bottom. After their move to Holland in 1906, the paper label was modified to read “Made in Grand Rapids And Holland”. The company then switched the logo to an actual brand, burned into the wood, generally found on the left inside of drawers, or underneath the sitting left arm of chairs. Pieces that were made with promotional possibilities, such as for popular hotels or clubs, sometimes had a special metal plate version of the logo, applied in visible areas on the back of pieces. After Van Raalte took over in 1922, the brand was modified and somewhat simplified, with the text “LIMBERT FURNITURE, TRADEMARK, BY VAN RAALTE CRAFTSMEN, GRAND RAPIDS & HOLLAND MICHIGAN”. By 1928 the brand was called “The Crest of Quality”, and was applied to furniture in a gold and black sticker form.

== Legacy ==
One of Limbert's most notable pieces, a jardiniere, was included among Stickley and other craftsmen's work in the 1973 show at the Art Museum of Princeton University that began the Arts and Crafts Revival.

Limbert's provided several major custom orders of furniture for the Old Faithful Inn in Yellowstone National Park. The hotel is still filled with Limbert Rockers, Arm-Chairs and Settles in the "Flanders" style, with a custom ordered yellow finish. Several wash stands remain in the Old House section of the Inn, and a number of pieces of Old Hickory furniture, a line represented by Limbert, are still in use.
