= Robert Searle (minister) =

American Presbyterian minister (1894–1967)

The Reverend Robert W. Searle D.D.
- General Secretary of the Greater New York Federation of Churches
- Searle in 1949
- Previous posts: Pastor, First Reformed Church of Albany; Associate pastor, Madison Avenue Presbyterian Church

Orders
- Ordination: 1921

Personal details
- Born: 1894 New Jersey, United States
- Died: June 17, 1967 (aged 73) North Tarrytown, New York, United States
- Denomination: Reformed Church in America; Presbyterian Church in the United States of America
- Parents: John Preston Searle (father)
- Spouse: Helen Menzies
- Children: 1
- Occupation: Pastor, nonprofit executive
- Education: Rutgers University; New Brunswick Theological Seminary

Robert Wyckoff Searle (1894 – June 17, 1967) was an American Reformed and Presbyterian minister and nonprofit executive. Active in interfaith and ecumenical work during his career, he spent 16 years as general secretary or in other senior roles at the Greater New York Federation of Churches and its successor organization.

Searle was born in New Jersey into a long line of clergy and graduated from seminary after serving in World War I. He was ordained in the Reformed Church in America and served as a pastor in New York City and Albany before returning to New York to minister in a Presbyterian church. He joined the Greater New York Federation in 1934. Searle authored several books while there. After leaving the federation, he became the founding editor of a Protestant newspaper. He later became the head of a social services organization serving families suffering from domestic violence.

== Early life and education ==
Searle was born in New Jersey in 1894. His father was John Preston Searle, a Reformed Church in America minister and longtime dean of New Brunswick Theological Seminary. Part of a family that arrived in New England in 1640, Robert Searle became the sixth in a direct line of ministers.

Searle received a B.A. from Rutgers University in 1915 and a divinity degree from the New Brunswick seminary in 1921. Between his studies, he served during World War I as a private in the United States Army Ambulance Service and as a sergeant major in the 303rd Field Artillery.

== Ordained ministry ==
Searle was ordained as a pastor in 1921 and served first as associate pastor of the Fort Washington Collegiate Reformed Church in New York City, then as pastor of First Reformed Church in Albany. He received an honorary doctorate of divinity from Rutgers in 1929. In 1930 he returned to New York as associate pastor of the Madison Avenue Presbyterian Church. In 1932, Searle helped organize a coalition of 45 social services agencies active in Yorkville, Manhattan.

Searle was active in ecumenical and interfaith work throughout his career. From 1934 to 1947, he was general secretary of the Greater New York Federation of Churches, which in 1946 merged into the Protestant Council of the City of New York and later became the Council of Churches of the City of New York. During World War II, in his role as general secretary of the Federation, he distributed armbands to clergy that would allow them free movement during air raids. After the 1946 merger that formed the Protestant Council of the City of New York, Searle was director of community relations for the council until 1950, when he became the founding editor of the 15,000-circulation Protestant World newspaper.

During his career, Searle preached in the pulpits of 16 different denominations. He was a supporter of the National Conference of Christians and Jews and wrote a manifesto condemning antisemitism. Searle was also a pacifist.

== Later life ==
Later in life, Searle shifted his career to what he called "applied religion": service to people in need. He was executive director of the Home Advisory and Service Council of New York, which provided family counseling and alcoholism treatment to individuals whose cases were being heard in the Home Term Court. (New York's Home Term Court was an experimental diversion program in the mid-20th-century for cases of domestic violence.)

Searle died at Phelps Memorial Hospital in North Tarrytown, New York, in 1967 at age 73.

== Personal life ==
Searle was married to Helen Menzies, and they had one son and two grandchildren. They lived in Briarcliff Manor, New York, where Helen Searle was chairwoman of the speech and drama department at Briarcliff College.

Starting in 1926, the Searles regularly spent their summers in the Adirondack town of Long Lake, New York. They rented Camp Kee-o-nekh and Camp Taiga starting in 1952 and purchased them in 1958, owning them until Robert Searle's death.

== Books ==
- Searle, R.W.; Bowers, F.A. (1933). Contemporary Religious Thinking: Seventeen Sermons on the Church's Responsibilities in the Period Just Ahead. Falcon Press.
- Searle, Robert W. (1938). City Shadows. New York: Friendship Press.
- Searle, Robert W. (1941). Author of Liberty. New York: Friendship Press.
- Searle, Robert W. (1943). Tell it to the Padre. New York: Farrar & Rinehart, Inc.
