= Christmas in July =

Second Christmas celebration

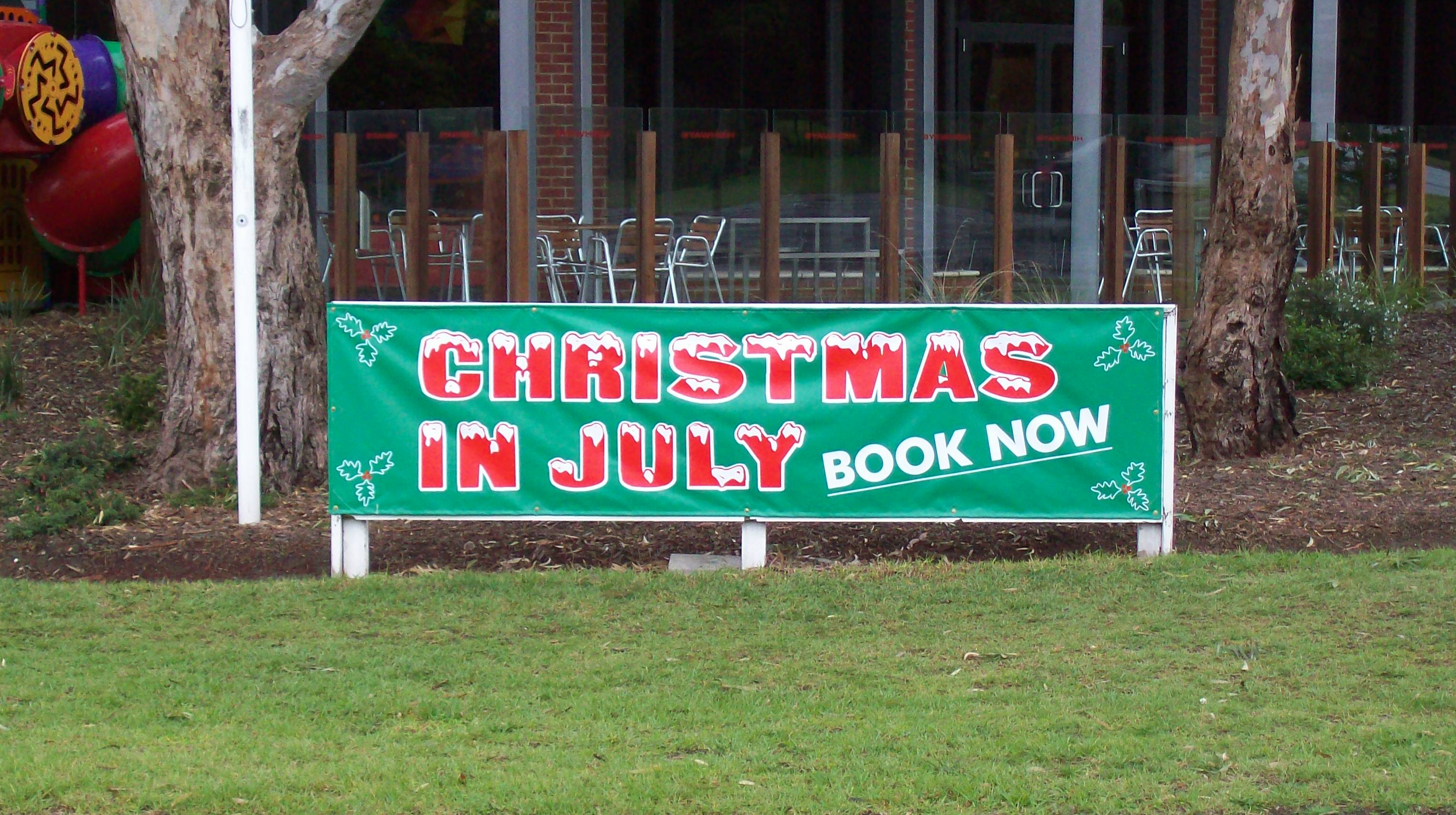
- A Christmas in July promotional banner outside a venue in Melbourne
- Date: July 25
- Also known as: Midwinter Christmas, Christmas in Winter, Christmas in Summer, Early Christmas

Christmas in July, also known as Christmas in Summer in the Northern Hemisphere and Christmas in Winter or Midwinter Christmas in the Southern Hemisphere, is a second Christmas celebration held on July 25 that falls outside the traditional period of Christmastide. It is centered on secular Christmas-themed activities and entertainment, including small gatherings, seasonal entertainment, and shopping. July Christmas celebrations typically accommodate those living in the Southern Hemisphere, where they experience winter at that time.

== Origins ==
Werther, an 1892 French opera with libretto by Édouard Blau, Paul Milliet, and Georges Hartmann, had an English translation published in 1894 by Elizabeth Beall Ginty. In the story, a group of children rehearse a Christmas song in July, to which a character responds: "When you sing Christmas in July, you rush the season." It is a translation of the French: "vous chantez Noël en juillet... c'est s'y prendre à l'avance." This opera is based on Goethe's The Sorrows of Young Werther. Christmas features in the book, but July does not.

According to reporting by Country Living magazine, the first "Christmas in July" celebration occurred from July 24–25, 1933 at a girls' camp (Keystone Camp) in Brevard, NC. It was the brainchild of Keystone Camp's co-founder, Fannie Holt.

In 1935, the National Recreation Association's journal Recreation described what a Christmas in July was like at "the National Camp Fire Girls' Camp in the Ramapo Mountains near Arden, New York," writing that "all mystery and wonder surround this annual event."

The term, if not the exact concept, was given national attention with the release of the Hollywood movie comedy Christmas in July in 1940, written and directed by Preston Sturges. In the story, a man is fooled into believing he has won $25,000 in an advertising slogan contest. He buys presents for family, friends, and neighbours, and proposes marriage to his girlfriend.

In 1942 the Calvary Baptist Church in Washington, D.C. celebrated Christmas in July with carols and the sermon "Christmas Presents in July". They repeated it in 1943, with a Christmas tree covered with donations. The pastor explained that the special service was patterned after a programme held each summer at his former church in Philadelphia, when the congregation would present Christmas gifts early to give ample time for their distribution to missions worldwide. It became an annual event, and in 1945, the service began to be broadcast over local radio.

The U.S. Post Office and U.S. Army and Navy officials, in conjunction with the American advertising and greeting card industries, threw a Christmas in July luncheon in New York in 1944 to promote an early Christmas mailing campaign for service men overseas during World War II. The luncheon was repeated in 1945.

American advertisers began using Christmas in July themes in print for summertime sales as early as 1950. In the United States, it is more often used as a marketing tool than an actual holiday. Television stations may choose to re-run Christmas specials, and many stores have Christmas in July sales. This is partly because most bargainers sell Christmas goods around July to make room for next year's inventory.

== Celebrations ==
=== Southern Hemisphere ===
In the Southern Hemisphere seasons are in reverse to the Northern Hemisphere, with summer falling in December, January, and February, and with winter falling in June, July, and August. Therefore in some Southern Hemisphere countries, such as Australia, South Africa, and New Zealand, Christmas in July or Midwinter Christmas events are undertaken to have Christmas with a winter feel in common with the Northern Hemisphere. These countries still also celebrate Christmas on December 25, in their summer, like the Northern Hemisphere.

=== Northern Hemisphere ===
In the Northern Hemisphere a Christmas in July celebration is deliberately ironic; the July climate is typically hot and either sunny or rainy with thunderstorms, as opposed to the cold and snowy conditions traditionally associated with Christmas celebrations in the higher latitudes of the Northern Hemisphere. Some people throw parties during July that mimic Christmas celebrations, bringing the atmosphere of Christmas but with warmer temperatures. Parties may include Santa Claus, ice cream, and other cold foods and gifts. Nightclubs often host parties open to the public. Christmas in July is usually recognized as July 25.

The Hallmark Channel and its companion outlets (Hallmark Family and Hallmark Mystery) run blocks of their original Christmas television films in July to coincide with the release of the Keepsake Ornaments in stores, thus literally making the event a Hallmark holiday (an accusation that Hallmark Cards officially denies).

Every July the television home shopping channel QVC sells Christmas in July, mostly decor and early gift ideas for children. What was once a 24-hour bloc of holiday shopping every July 25 (or the closest weekend day to it) has become a month-long event: generally, the sales begin on July 1 and are showcased throughout the day, with various blocs of holiday sale programming sales throughout the month. Typically, during the last week of July, QVC dedicates entire days to holiday sales.

There is also Christmas in June. In some western countries, July has a limited number of marketing opportunities. In the United States and Canada, for example, there are no national holidays between the first week of July (Canada Day on July 1 in Canada and American Independence Day on July 4 in the United States) and Labor/Labour Day (the first Monday in September for both the US and Canada), leaving a stretch of about two months with no holidays (some Canadian provinces hold a Civic Holiday, but neither Canada nor the United States has ever recognized a national holiday during that time). The late July period provides relatively few opportunities for merchandising, since it is typically after the peak of summer product sales in June and early July, but before the "back to school" shopping period begins in August. Therefore, to justify sales promotions, shops (such as Leon's in Canada) will sometimes announce a "Christmas in July" sale.

A summer Christmas celebration is held on June 25 annually in Italy and worldwide. June 25 is a traditional Christmas celebration, or 6 months before the next, or 6 months after the previous (depending on how one looks at it).

It is celebrated at this particular moment as a statement and a reaction to the traditional Christmas celebration: there is no need to wait for one specific day to celebrate love, friendship, and peace. The movement started in Italy, Europe, where traditional Christmas is celebrated in winter, leading to the alternative celebration, 6 months later, to be celebrated in summer. While it started as an improvised summer celebration in Venice, it has become a yearly tradition. In the last 8 years, the celebrations have taken place mainly in Sardinia, but the tradition is spreading across the world and becoming a worldwide movement.

In parts of Denmark people may have small Christmas celebrations and put up decorations for what is known as "Jul i Juli" (translated as 'Christmas in July'). It is a simple play on words that has come to be celebrated by some, although it is not an official holiday.

==== Christmas in August ====
In the 1950s the Christmas in July celebration became a Christmas in August celebration at Yellowstone National Park. There are multiple theories concerning the origin of this celebration. Park employees, who were nicknamed "Savages" until the mid-1970s, were known to throw large employee parties in July complete with floats, skits, and dances. Some have speculated that the Christmas in August celebration was a way to extend the mid-summer festivities to the public and subdue the employee-only celebration. Another theory is that the celebration began as a way to incorporate a performance of Handel's 'Messiah' by a student ministry working in the park.

==== Christmas in July in September ====
Christmas in July in September has been marked as a celebration by some. For example, Parker, Arizona had a celebration for it in September 2020. While in the Philippines, Christmas celebrations of the longest running holiday season in the world begin four months early and run through the end of the year until Epiphany. Celebrations will unofficially start in September and run through months that end in "-ber" (September, October, November, and December).
