= Old Faithful Inn =

- U.S. National Register of Historic Places
- U.S. National Historic Landmark
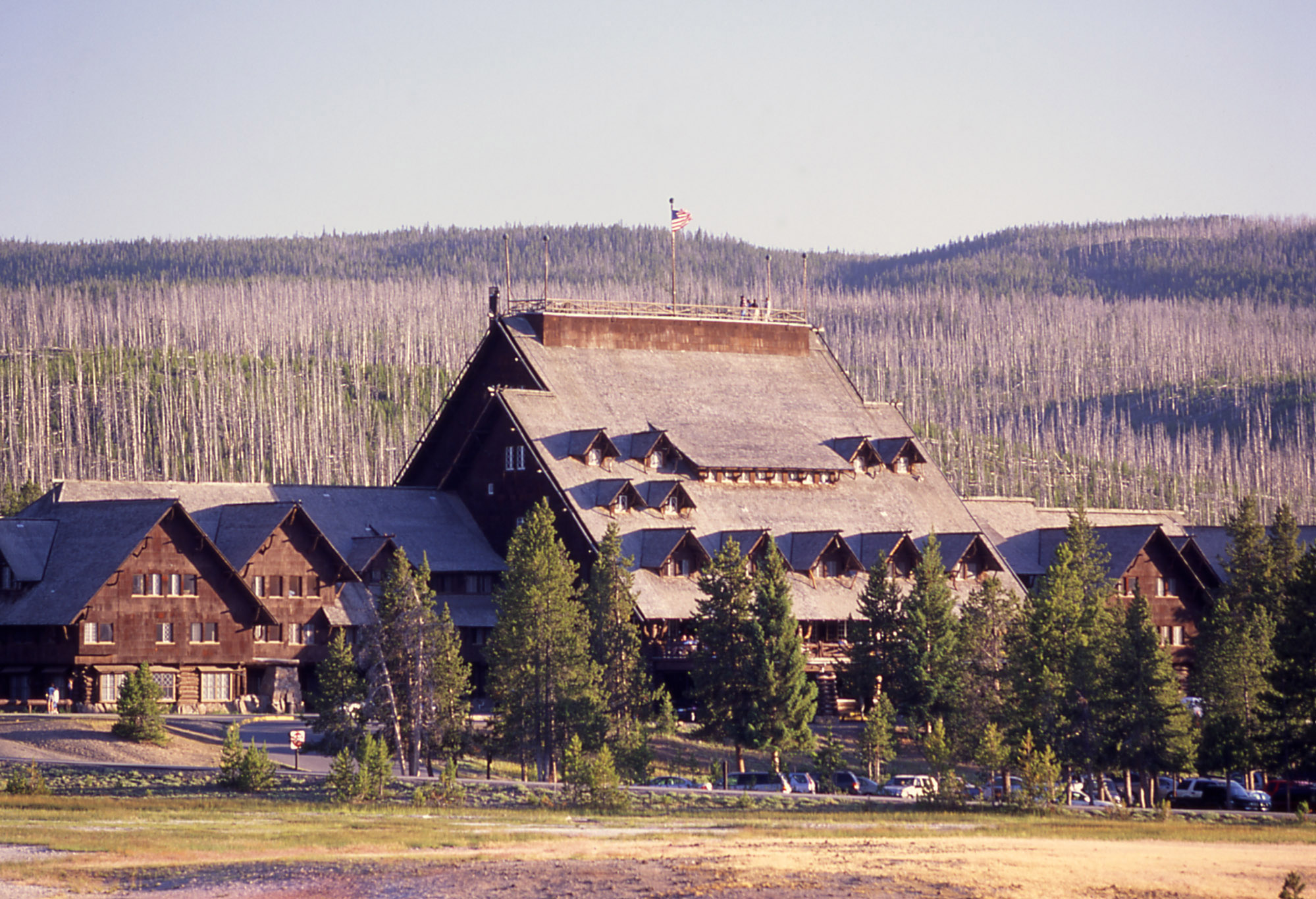

- Location within the United States Location within Wyoming
- Location: Upper Geyser Basin, Yellowstone National Park
- Coordinates: 44°27′35″N 110°49′52″W
- Built: 1904
- Architect: Reamer, Robert C.
- Architectural style: National Park Service Rustic
- NRHP reference No.: 73000226

Significant dates
- Added to NRHP: July 23, 1973
- Designated NHL: May 28, 1987

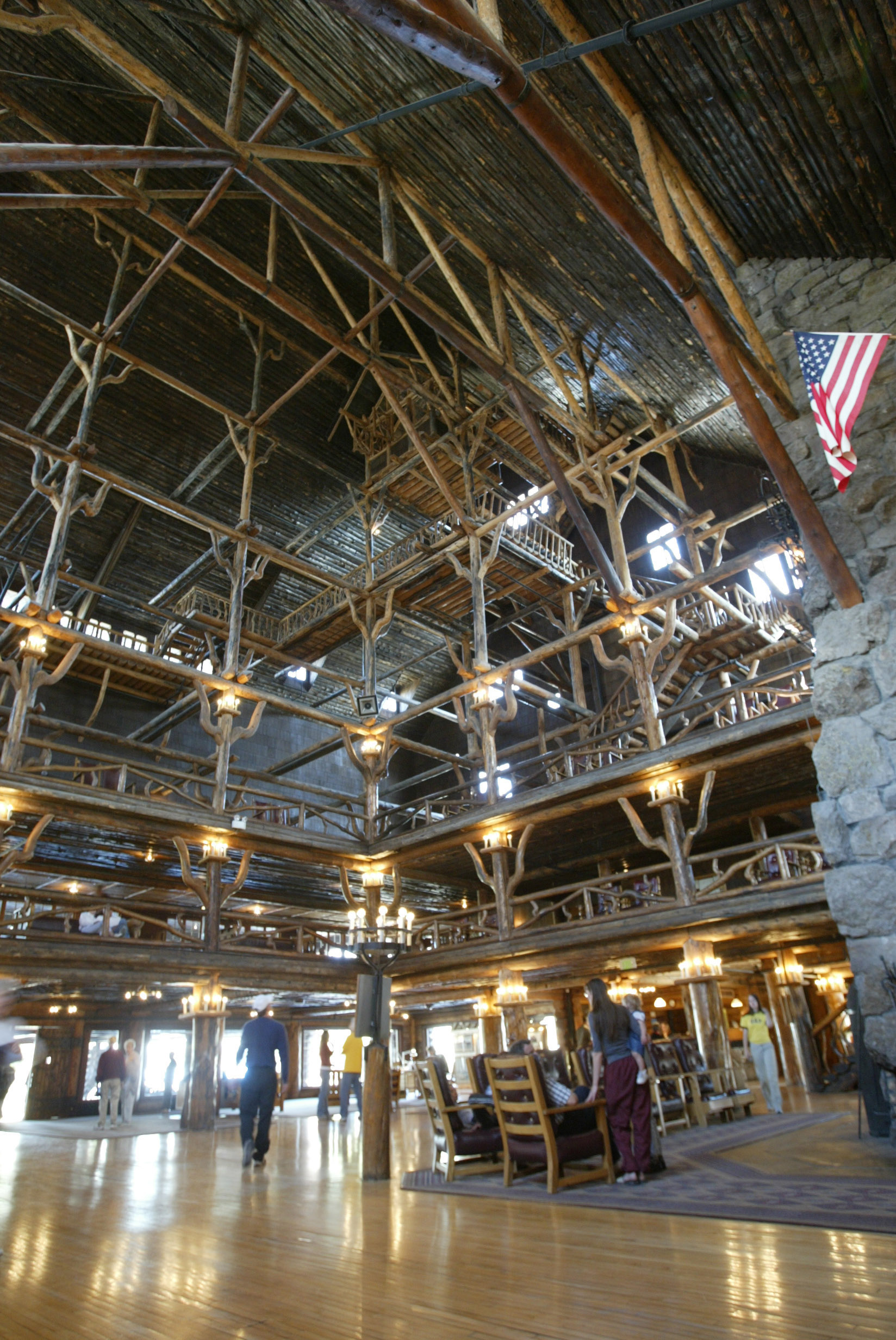
The interior contains four stories of balconies, but only the bottom two are open to the public.

The Old Faithful Inn is a hotel in the western United States with a view of the Old Faithful Geyser, located in Yellowstone National Park, Wyoming. The Inn has a multi-story log lobby, flanked by long frame wings containing guest rooms. In the western portion of the park, it sits at an approximate elevation of 7,350 feet (2,240 m) above sea level. Old Faithful Inn is a member of Historic Hotels of America, the official program of the National Trust for Historic Preservation.

With its log and limb lobby and massive (500-short-ton or 450-metric-ton, 85-foot or 26-meter) stone fireplace, the inn is an example of the "Golden Age" of rustic resort architecture, a style which is also known as National Park Service Rustic. It is one of the few log hotels still standing in the United States, and was the first of the great park lodges of the American west.

Initial construction was carried out over the winter of 1903–1904, largely using locally obtained materials including lodgepole pine and rhyolite stone. When the Old Faithful Inn first opened in the spring of 1904, it boasted electric lights and steam heat.

The structure is the largest log hotel in the world; possibly even the largest log building in the world. In 2007 the American Institute of Architects conducted a survey to determine the 150 favorite buildings in America; the Old Faithful Inn ranked 36th. The Inn, which was designated a National Historic Landmark in 1987, is itself part of the Old Faithful Historic District.

== Design ==
The inn's architect was 29-year-old Robert Reamer, an architect for the Yellowstone Park Company, which was affiliated with the Northern Pacific Railway. Reamer was hired by Harry W. Child, the president of the Yellowstone Park Company, who had met Reamer in San Diego through mutual acquaintances. Reamer designed the lobby and the initial phase of guest rooms, known as the Old House, which was built in 1903–1904, much of it in the long winter. The east wing was extended in 1913–14, and the west wing in 1927, creating a single structure almost 700 feet (210 m) long. The Old House is rotated 90 degrees with respect to Old Faithful so that a view of the geyser is framed by the entrance porch for arriving visitors. The porch roof provides a viewing platform for viewing eruptions of Old Faithful and other geysers, while the main facade faces Geyser Hill across the Firehole River, where the old Circuit Road once ran through the geyser basin.

The central feature of the Old House is a tall gabled log structure housing the lobby, dominated by a deep, steeply-pitching shingled roof. The Old House uses load-bearing log lower exterior walls with a log pole interior framework supporting seven stories, six of which are the roof structure. The upper gable walls are of milled lumber framing with shingle sheathing. The front slope of the shingled roof is accented by shed and gabled dormers, some of which are purely decorative. Both interior and exterior framing is supported by twisted or curved branches, giving the entire structure a strongly rustic air. There are two levels of balconies, the lower encircling the lobby and the upper on two sides. Stairs climb from the second balcony to a platform in the framing known as the "Crow's Nest" which once was used by musicians to entertain guests, then on to the crown of the gable 92 feet (28 m) above the lobby floor. The entire structure is crowned by a roof walk that once held searchlights to illuminate Old Faithful Geyser at night. The original guest wings are 3 1/2 stories tall on either side of the lobby. It is anchored to the ground by a rhyolite foundation that extends to the first floor window sills.

Offset to the southeast corner, the stone fireplace measures sixteen feet (5 m) square at the base. It features four main hearths, one on each face, with smaller hearths, each with a flue, at the corners. The stone extends to the roof, and until it was damaged by earthquake, a brick flue extended above the roof, covered in log cribbing. An ironwork clock decorates the north face of the upper chimney in the lobby. The fireplace is centered in a shallow depression in the lobby floor that sets the area around its hearths apart from the rest of the lobby. Custom ironwork, most notable in the main entrance door and the clock, was forged at the site by an ironmonger named Colpitts.

The dining room extends to the south of the lobby, with log scissors trusses supporting a more shallowly-pitched roof at right angles to the lobby roof. The dining room has its own stone fireplace, less massive than the lobby's, but still large. The Old House guest rooms retain much of their original character.

The east and west wings were purposely designed by Reamer to be less prominent than the central house. The wings are three to four stories in height with a mansarded top floor and a flat roof. The east wing is straight, originally with 100 rooms. The west wing is Y-shaped, with 150 guest rooms as built. The interiors of the wings are unremarkable compared with the Old House.

== History ==
The Old Faithful Inn replaced the Upper Geyser Basin Hotel, also known as the "Shack Hotel", which had burned down. The Northern Pacific Railroad, in the form of the Yellowstone Park Association operating company, was required by the terms of its concession to build a new hotel no closer than 1/8 mile of Old Faithful, a stipulation the Yellowstone Park Association observed to the letter. An initial design was prepared by architect A.W. Spalding in 1898, producing a design typical of the time, a turreted Queen Anne style hotel. The design was approved by the Park Service, but construction never started. Child instead hired Reamer to design a much more radical building with antecedents in the rustic camps of the Adirondacks. Design work took place in 1902, and construction started in 1903, with work continuing through the winter to open in 1904. The original cost of the Inn was about $140,000, using materials gathered from within the park. The hotel was furnished for another $25,000. Most of the logs came from a location about 8 miles (13 km) south of Old Faithful, where a temporary sawmill produced boards as needed. Stone came from the Black Sand Basin and from a site along the road to Craig Pass about five miles (8 km) to the east. The unusually-shaped log brackets were collected from the surrounding forests.

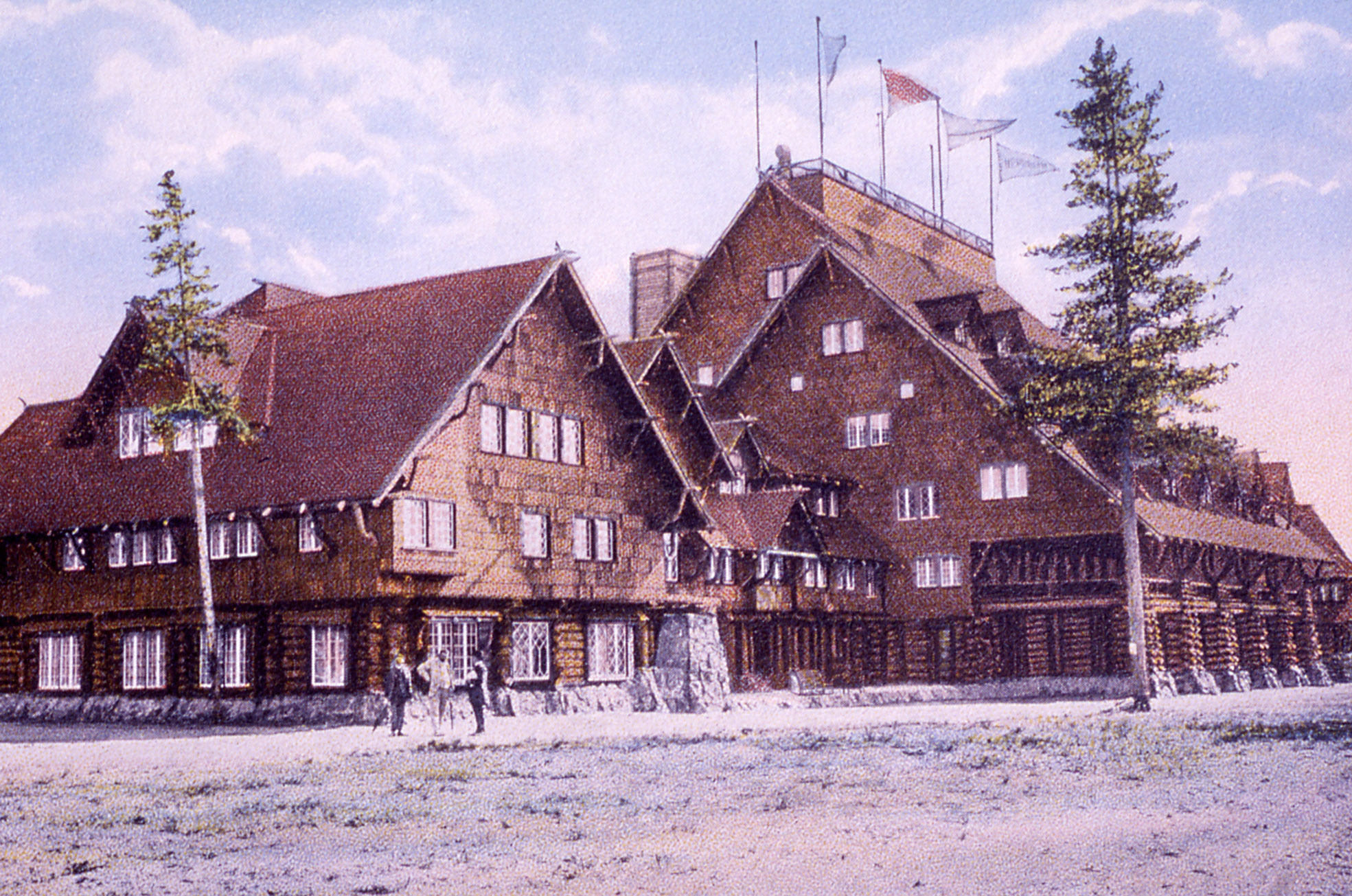
The inn in 1914

The Inn has been expanded and modified several times. In 1913 the East Wing was added to the 120-room original structure, and in 1922 the dining room was enlarged. In 1927–1928, the West Wing was built, and the front of the main building extended. All of these modifications were carried out under the supervision of the original architect, Robert Reamer. A 1927 addition to the dining room has since become home to the Bear Pit Lounge. Installed in 1936 just off the lobby, the first Bear Pit featured carved and inlaid wood panels with humorous scenes involving bears, created at Reamer's suggestion. When the lounge was converted to a coffee shop, the lounge was relocated to the dining room extension and the panels were replicated in etched glass in 1988. Some of the original panels remain in the snack bar. In 1940 the interior logs were peeled, revealing patterns created by bark beetles, and in 1966 the logs were cleaned and varnished. An automatic fire sprinkler system was added in 1948, together with fire doors in the wings.

Some of the original furnishings remain, while care has been taken with newer pieces to remain compatible with the rustic design. Some furniture at the Old Faithful Inn was salvaged from the Canyon Hotel before it was demolished, particularly the Limbert chairs in the dining room extension and some of the reading desks on the balcony.

The facility was closed for the duration of the Second World War (along with all other hotels in the park) and the park was unprepared for the huge number of visitors in 1946.

Late on August 17, 1959, the Old Faithful Inn was shaken by the Hebgen Lake earthquake, which collapsed the dining room fireplace chimney and damaged the huge lobby fireplace, reducing the number of usable hearths from eight to two. The building was partially shaken loose from its foundations, and access to some of the upper levels had to be restricted due to safety concerns. There were no deaths or serious injuries at the Inn as a result of the earthquake. The dining room fireplace was finally rebuilt in 1985, but the outside portion of the lobby fireplace chimney was replaced with a single steel pipe, visible in many exterior photos.

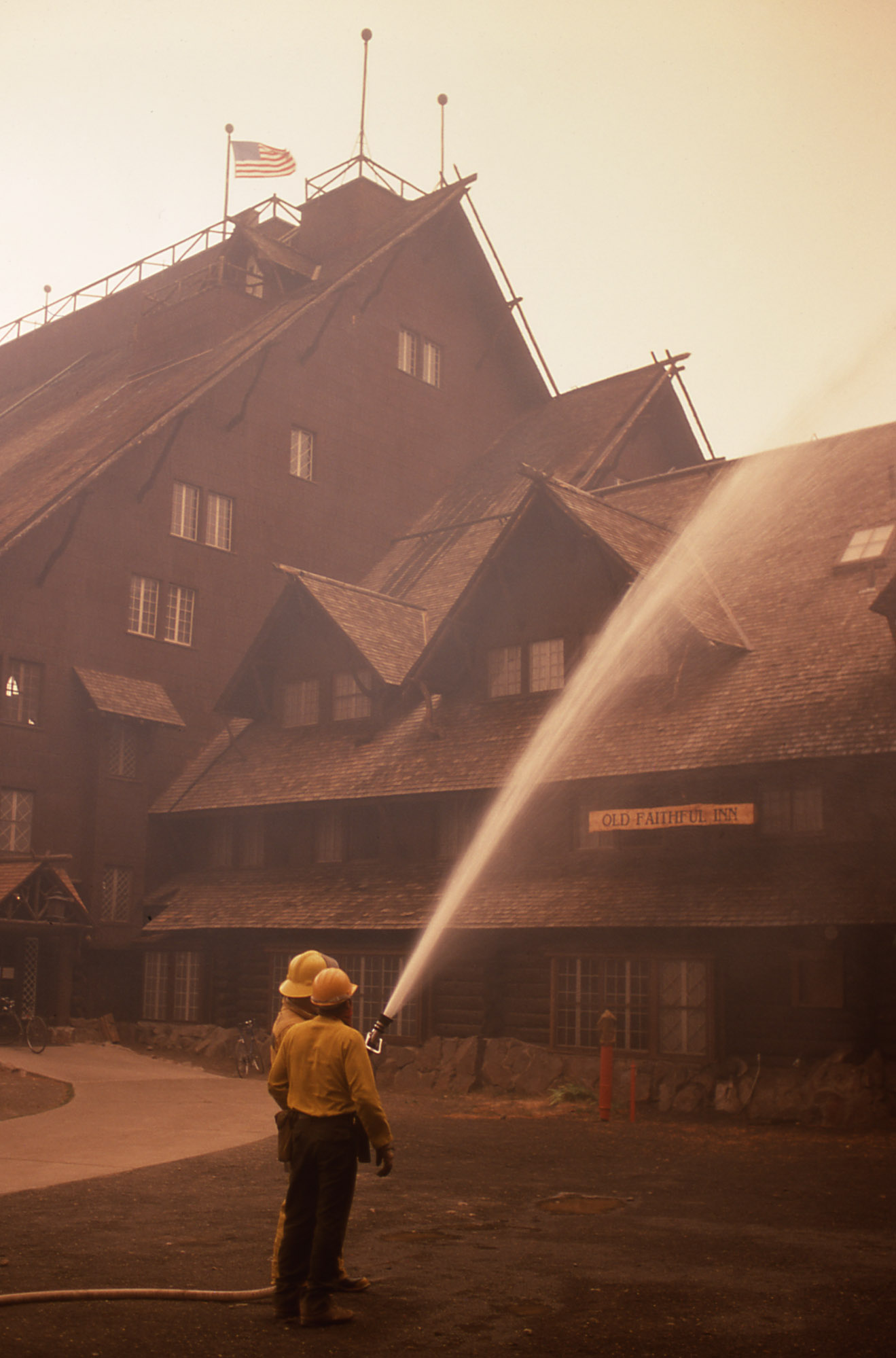
A firefighter sprays water on the roof as a precaution during the 1988 fires

In 1988, the inn was threatened by the North Fork Fire, in which approximately 36 percent of the park was affected. It was saved by the actions of firefighters, volunteers, and a rooftop sprinkler system installed the previous year.

The high-range rooms in the East and West wing additions were renovated in 1993 and 1994. In celebration of the Inn's centennial in 2004, a major renovation project of the original "Old House" started construction, with completion in 2008. The project brought the Inn to current building codes and installed new electrical, plumbing, and heating systems, as well as structural upgrades. Finishes were cleaned and restored, maintaining as much of the historic material as possible. Wood and wool floor finishes, bathroom tile and fixtures, new replica historic hardware, and an interpretation of the original lavatory stands and basins by Charles Limbert were installed. Original elements including the recessing of the floor and hearth of the large fireplace in the main lobby and reconstruction of log walls removed in the lobby corrected modifications and changes over the years and brought the Inn back to match more closely Reamer's original design.

=== Presidential visitors ===
Its notable visitors are numerous, even preceding its construction. Chester A. Arthur camped outside the East Wing area in 1883, Theodore Roosevelt visited the site in 1903, Warren Harding stayed in 1923, Calvin Coolidge in 1927, and Franklin Roosevelt in the fall of 1937.

=== Christmas in August ===
According to park lore, a freak blizzard struck the Old Faithful Inn on August 25 sometime in the early twentieth century. Rather than lament the fact that they were isolated, the guests were said to have taken the opportunity to celebrate Christmas in August.

== In popular culture ==
- The Old Faithful Inn was featured in the 1936 film Yellowstone.

== Influences ==
The Old Faithful Inn had a pronounced effect on the built environment in North American national parks, influencing the development of the National Park Service Rustic style that became widespread during the 1920s. Although it was not the first hotel with a multi-story lobby, the concept became widespread in the mid-20th century in urban hotels. In 2007 the Old Faithful Inn was selected as number 36 on a list of the 150 favorite buildings in the United States in a poll by the American Institute of Architects.

== Historic designations ==
The Old Faithful Inn was placed on the National Register of Historic Places on July 23, 1973. It was designated a National Historic Landmark on May 28, 1987. It is the central element in the Old Faithful Historic District, which includes the Old Faithful Lodge on the other side of Old Faithful. The Lodge, which was designed by Gilbert Stanley Underwood to provide dining and guest services to a community of tent cabins, is lower and more understated in nature, but compatibly rustic.

Images of Old Faithful Inn
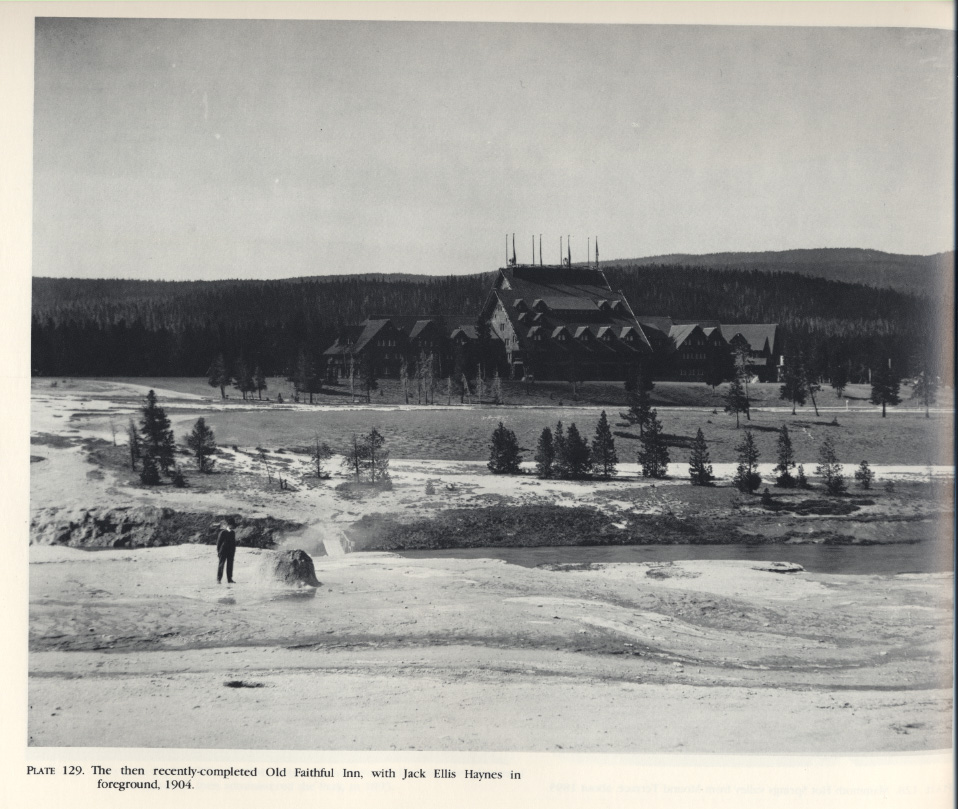
Old Faithful Inn from Beehive Geyser, 1904 by Frank Jay Haynes

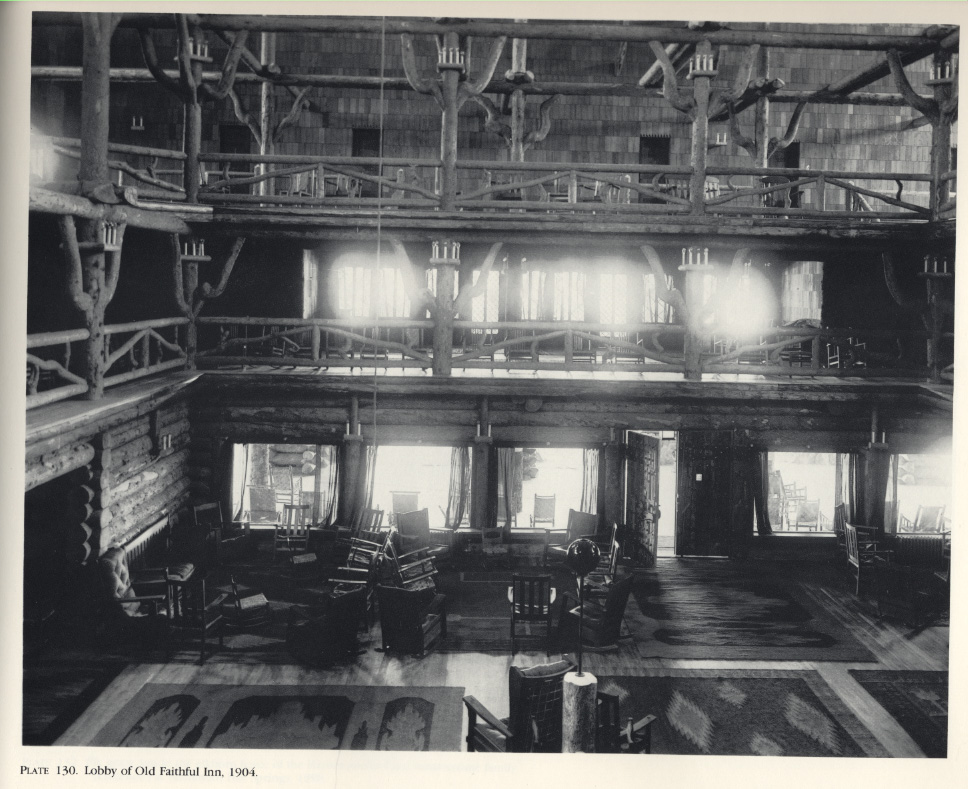
Old Faithful Inn Lobby, 1904, Frank Jay Haynes

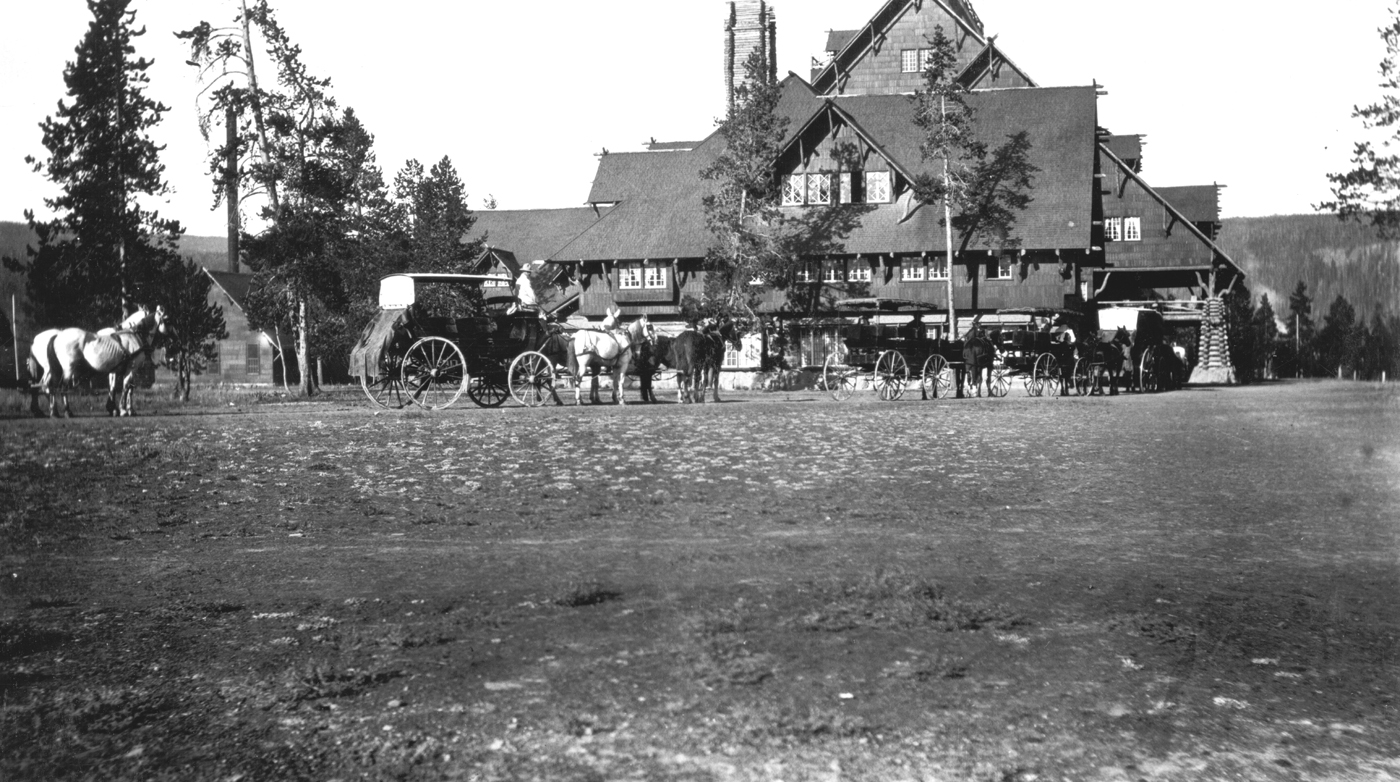
1909

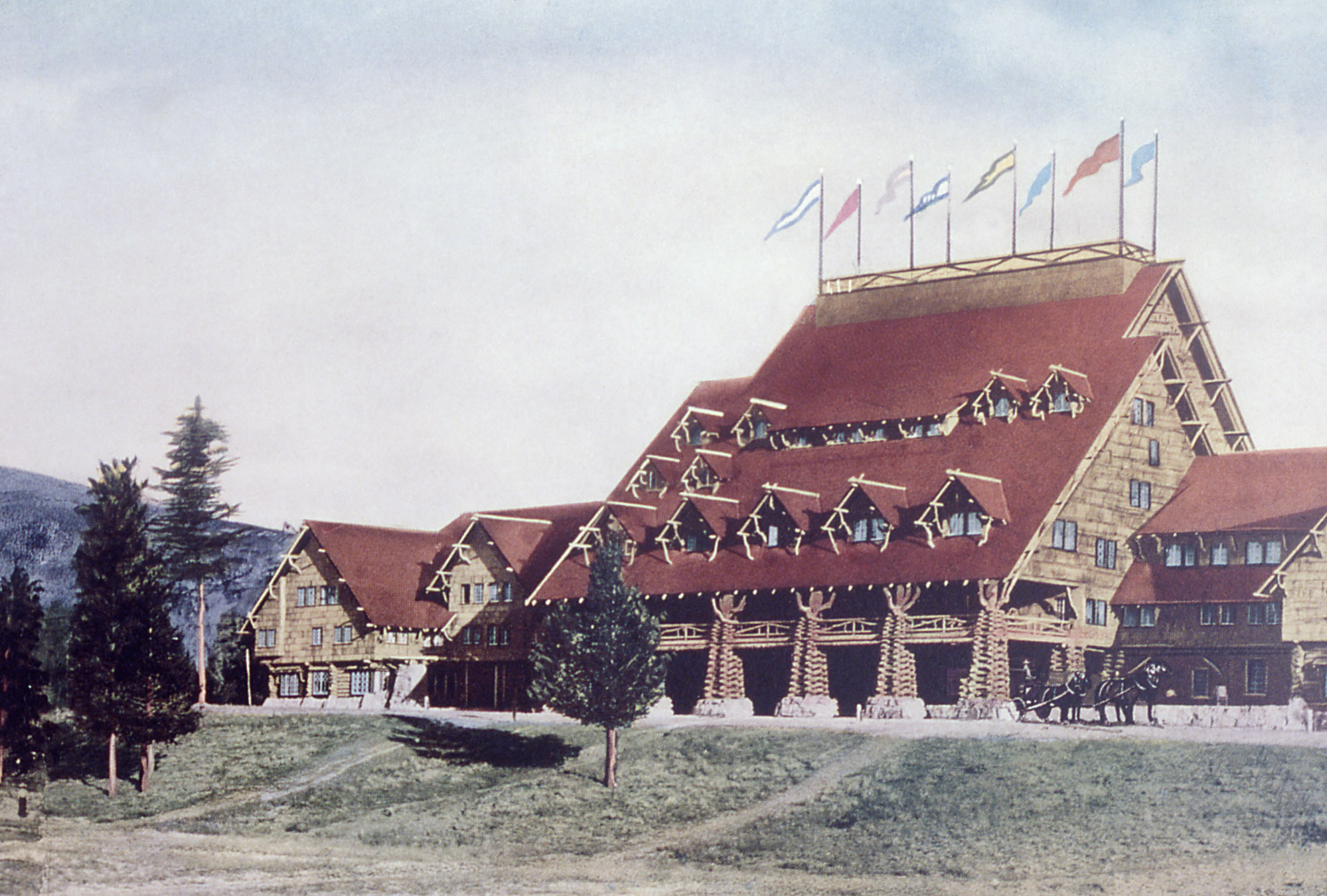
Undated Frank Jay Haynes postcard

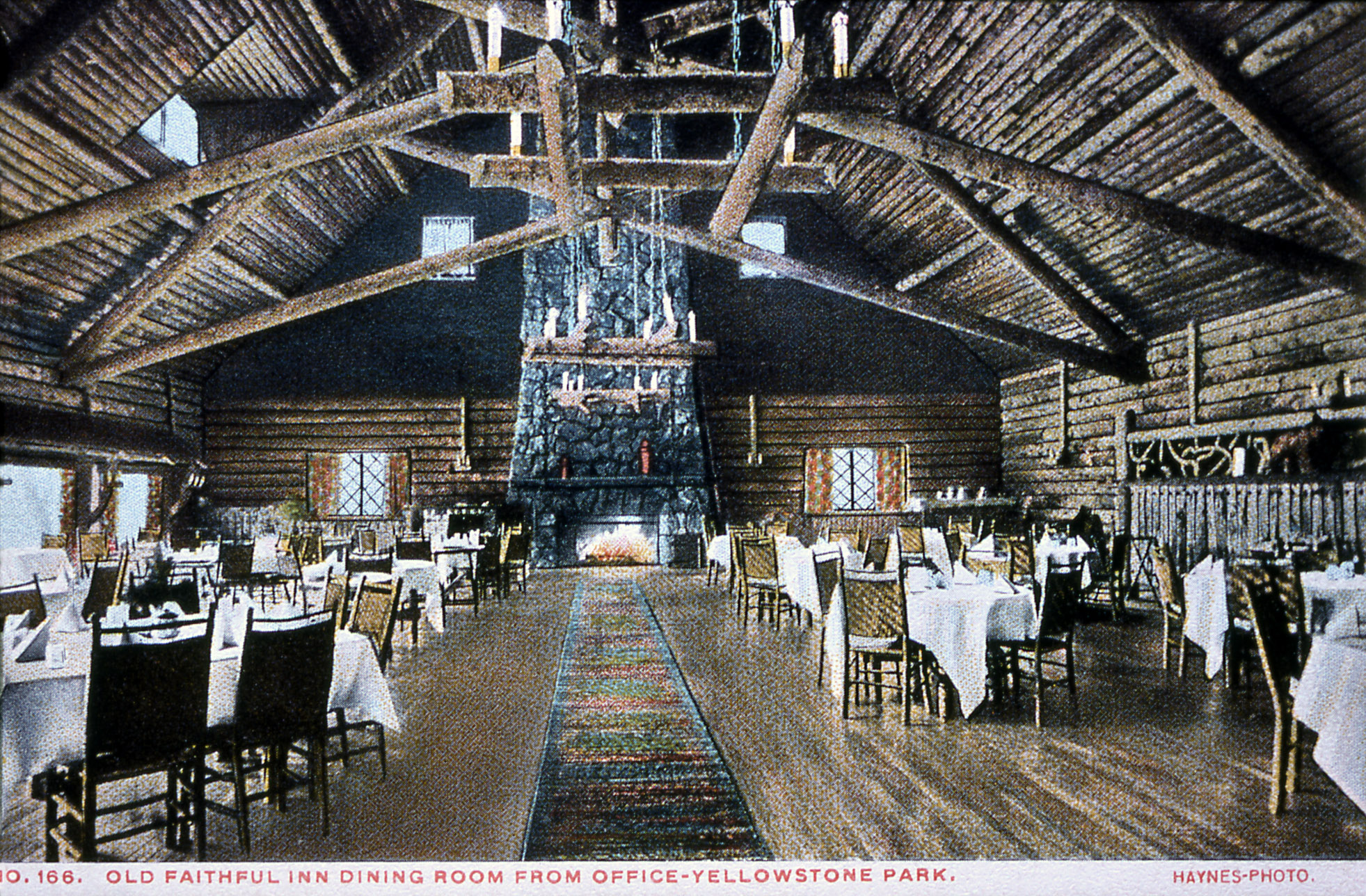
Undated Frank Jay Haynes postcard of Old Faithful Inn Dining Room

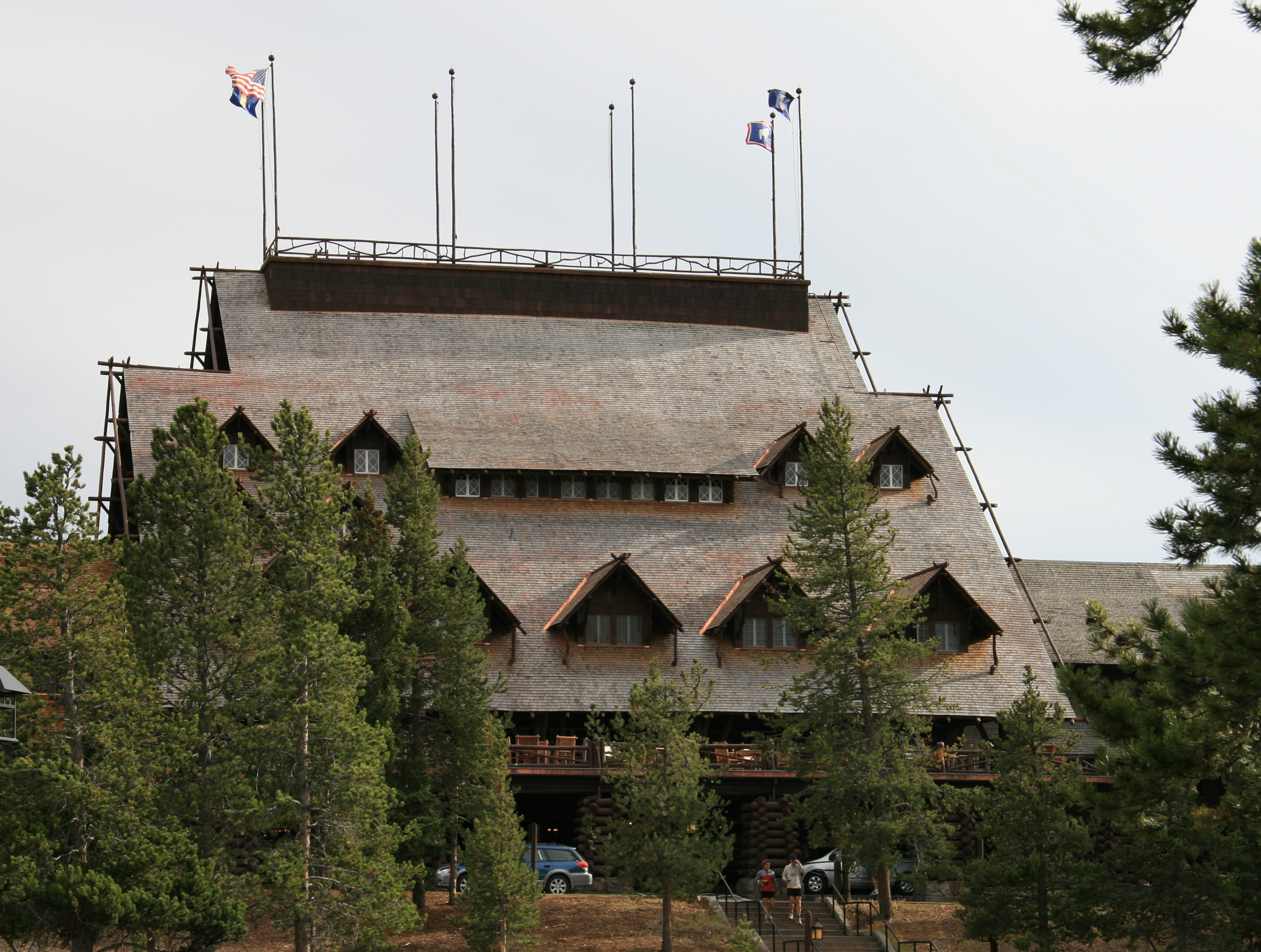
Summer 2007

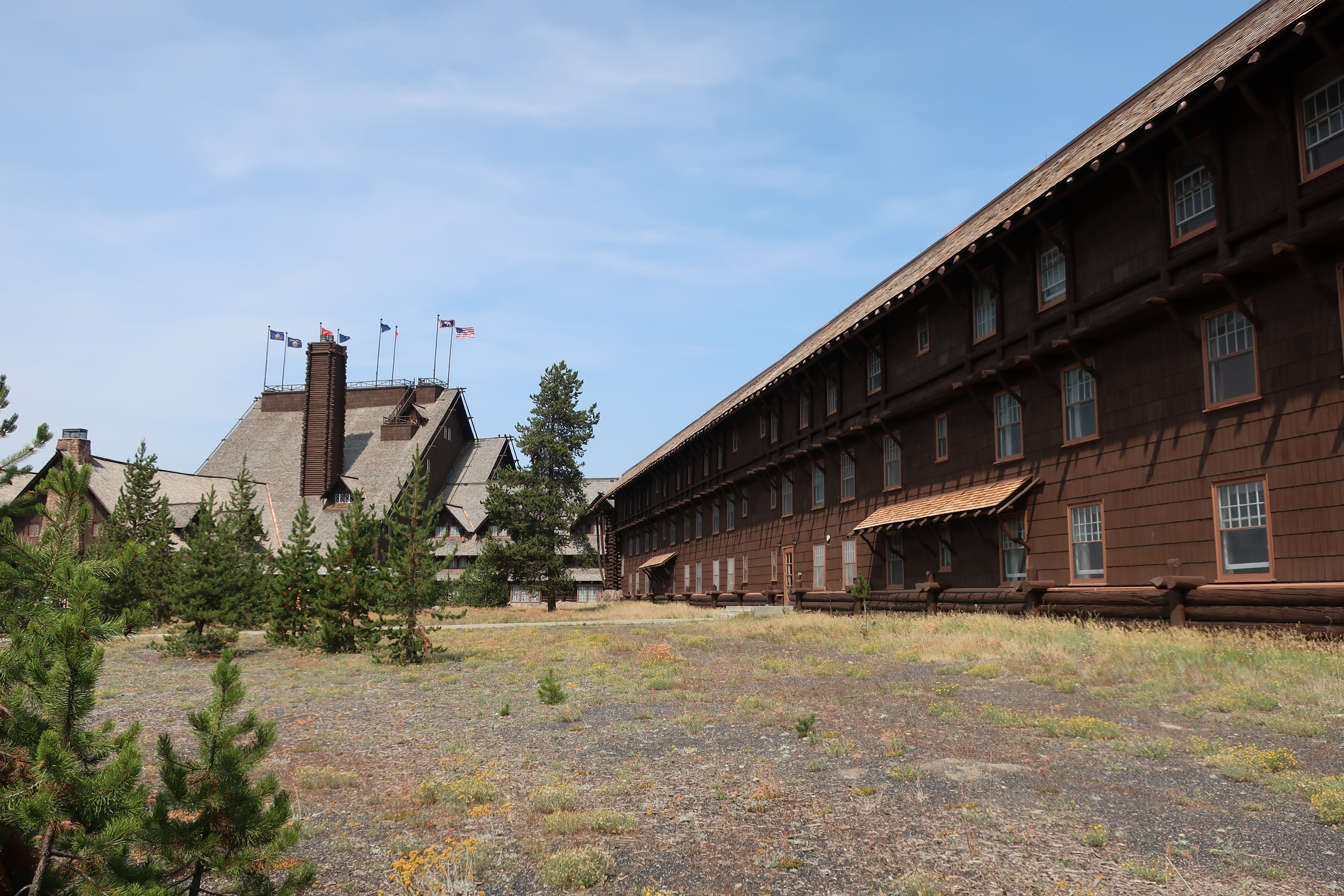
East Wing, 2017

== See also ==
- List of Historic Hotels of America
- Château Montebello, a Canadian equivalent

== Sources ==
- Barringer, Mark Daniel. Selling Yellowstone: Capitalism and the Construction of Nature, Lawrence, Kansas: University Press of Kansas, 2002. ISBN 0-7006-1167-3
- Haines, Aubrey L. The Yellowstone Story: A History of Our First National Park, Niwot, Colorado: University Press of Colorado, 1996. ISBN 0-87081-390-0
- Kaiser, Harvey H. Landmarks in the Landscape: Historic Architecture in the National Parks of the West, San Francisco: Chronicle Books, 1997, ISBN 0-8118-1854-3
- Quinn, Ruth. Weaver of Dreams: The Life and Architecture of Robert C. Reamer, Gardiner, Montana: Leslie & Ruth Quinn, 2004. ISBN 0-9760945-0-9
