= Suburban Life (magazine) =

American shelter magazine

- Editor: Denman Blanchard, and then; Frank A. Arnold
- Categories: Lifestyle
- Frequency: Monthly
- Publisher: various
- First issue: December 1904
- Final issue: July 1917
- Country: US
- Based in: Harrisburg, Pennsylvania, etc.
- Language: English

Suburban Life was an American shelter magazine that ran from 1904 to 1917. It was directed toward families who did not live in a city. A typical issue would feature stories on topics such as home furniture, home improvements and remodeling, practical hints, harvesting crops, profitable hobbies (e.g., beekeeping), scenic sights, woodland animals, protecting birds, camp activities, tree varieties, construction projects, successful gardening, perils of farming, and pleasures of farming. The articles were submitted by field and educational experts.

== History ==
It was published by Colonial Press, located in Harrisburg (Pa.), Boston, and New York City, 1904–07 ... The next publisher was Suburban Press, located in Harrisburg, Boston, and New York City, 1907–16 ... The final was Independent Corporation, located in Harrisburg and New York City, 1916–17. A contributing editor was agricultural giant Liberty Hyde Bailey, from 1914 to 1916.

The original title was Suburban Country Life. It was changed two months later to Suburban Life. Hoping to gain a larger readership, the title and format were changed to Countryside Magazine and Suburban Life, in October 1914. It lasted until July 1917. The title was Suburban Life from February 1905 to September 1914. That's the vast majority of the magazine's history.

Country Life in America filed a lawsuit against them in January 1905. This was due to their similar names. Suburban Country Life dropped the middle word in its name after only two issues, in order to avoid a long and costly trial. This was explained in its issue of February 1905 on p. 2 ("Around the Office Desk").

Leading the original staff were President Denman Blanchard and Vice President/General Manager Frank A. Arnold. The presidency was later turned over to Arnold.
