= A Christian Ministry in the National Parks =

A Christian Ministry in the National Parks (ACMNP) is a Christian ministry in the United States National Parks since the 1950s. It was founded in 1952 by Warren Ost in coordination with the National Council of Churches.
