= Edison, New Jersey =

Township in New Jersey, United States

- Township
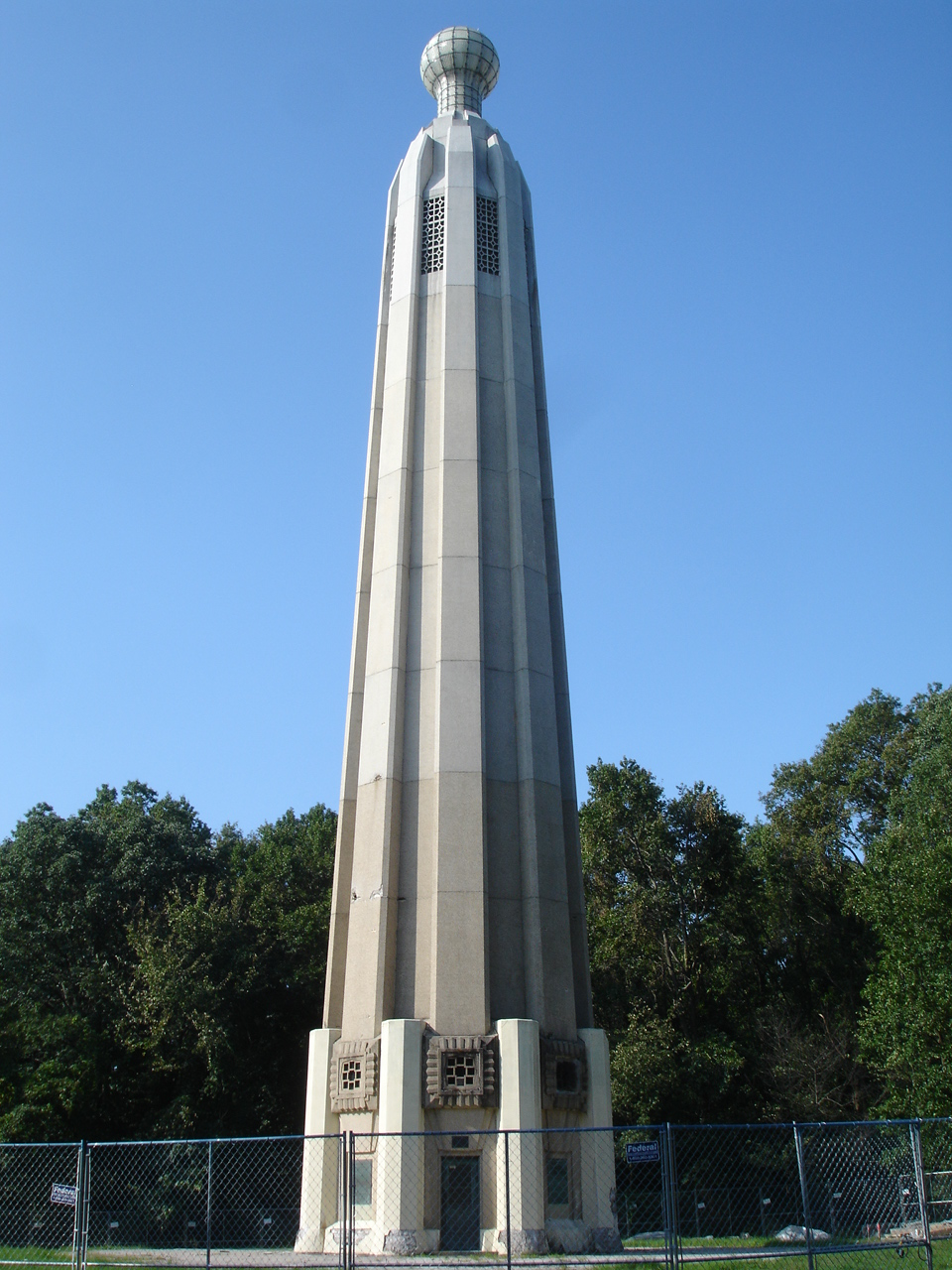
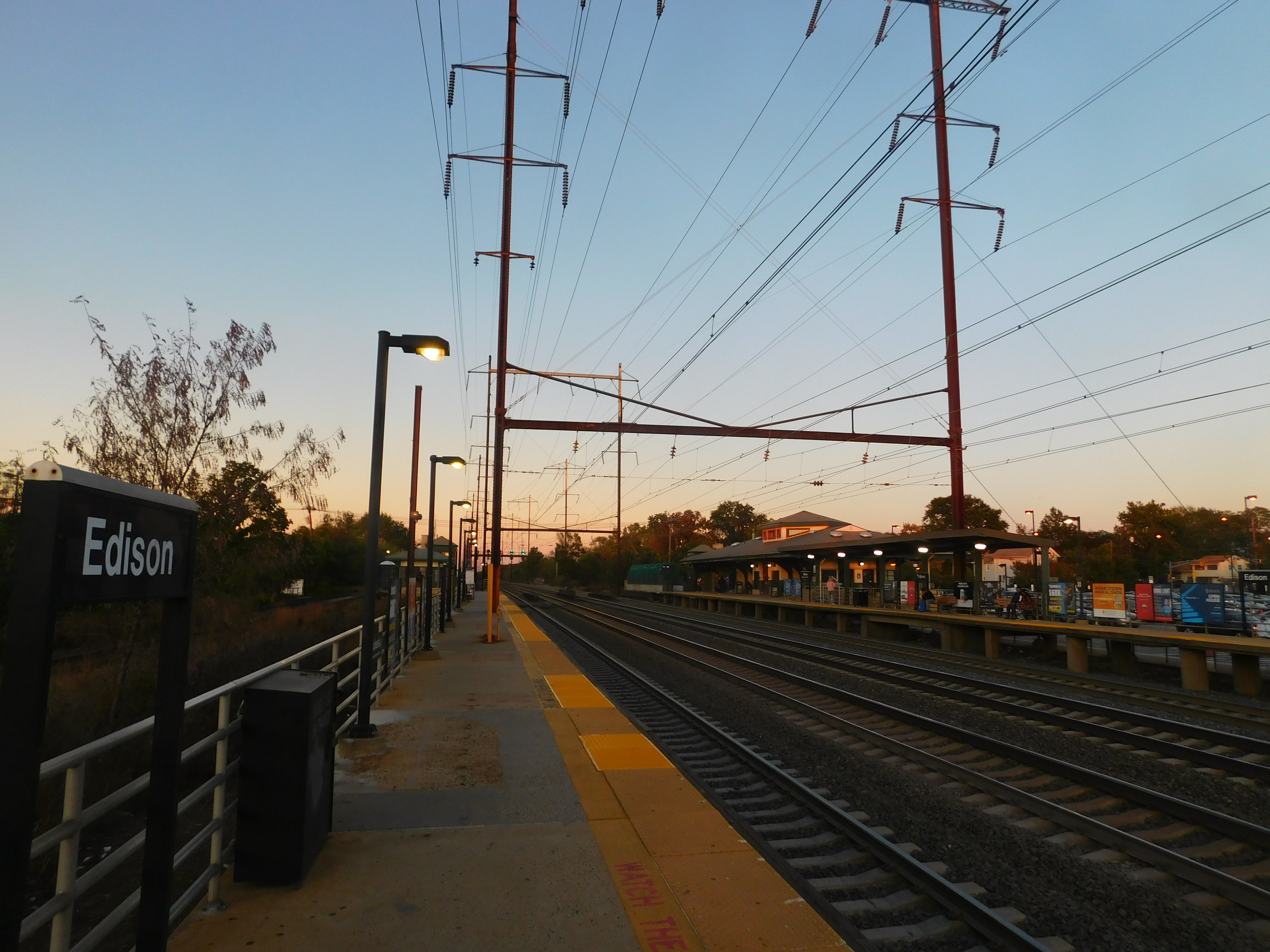
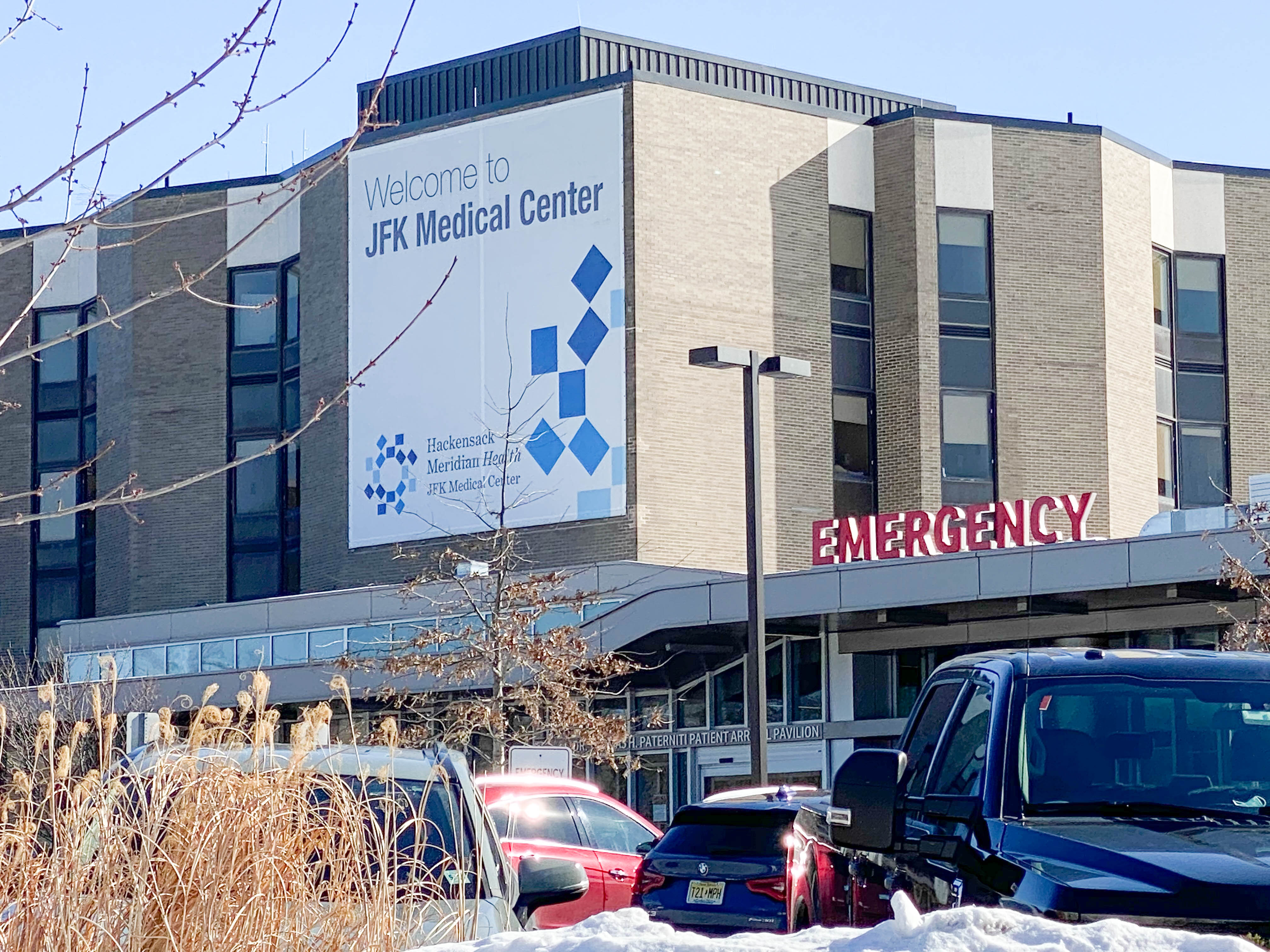
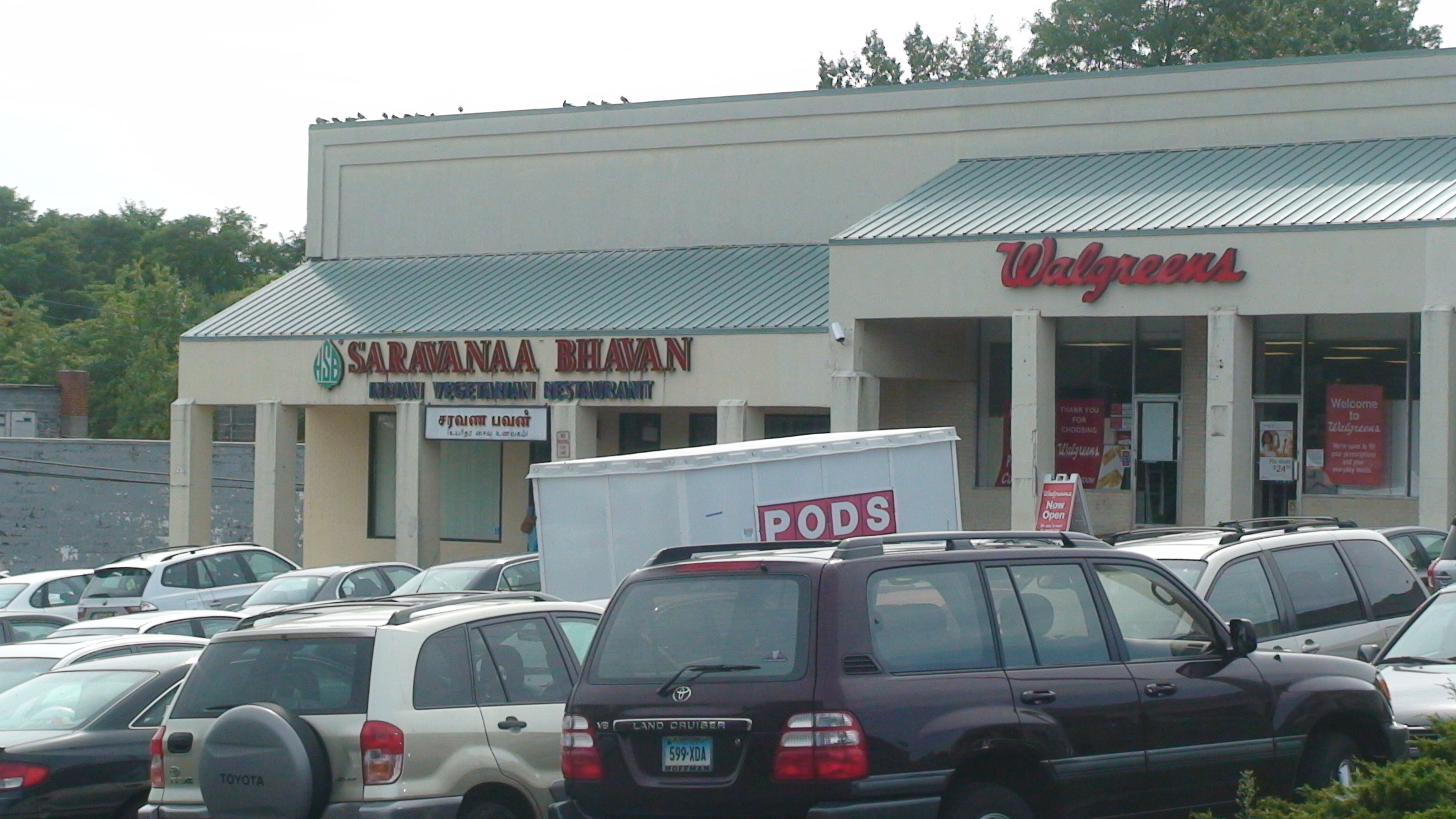
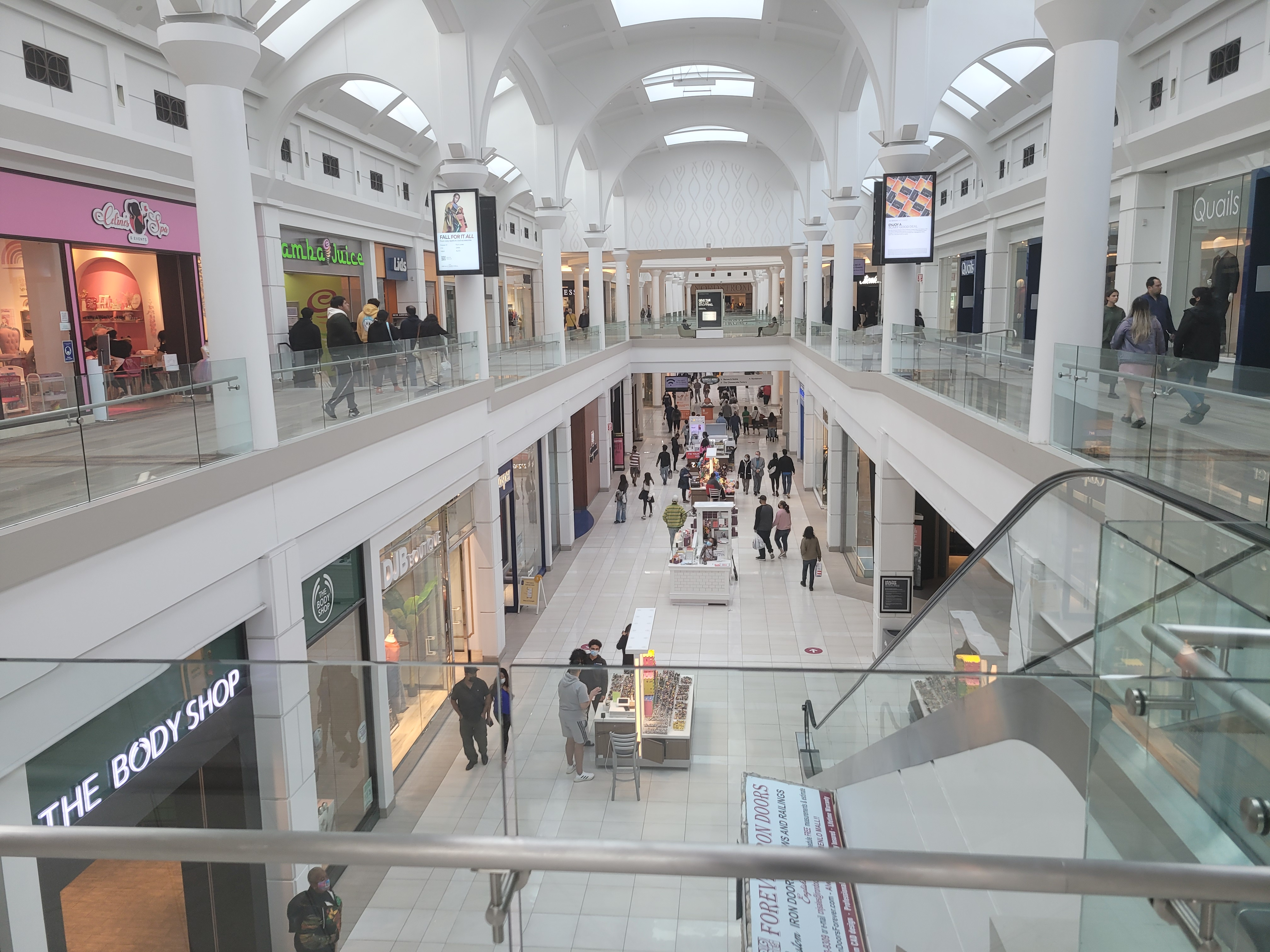
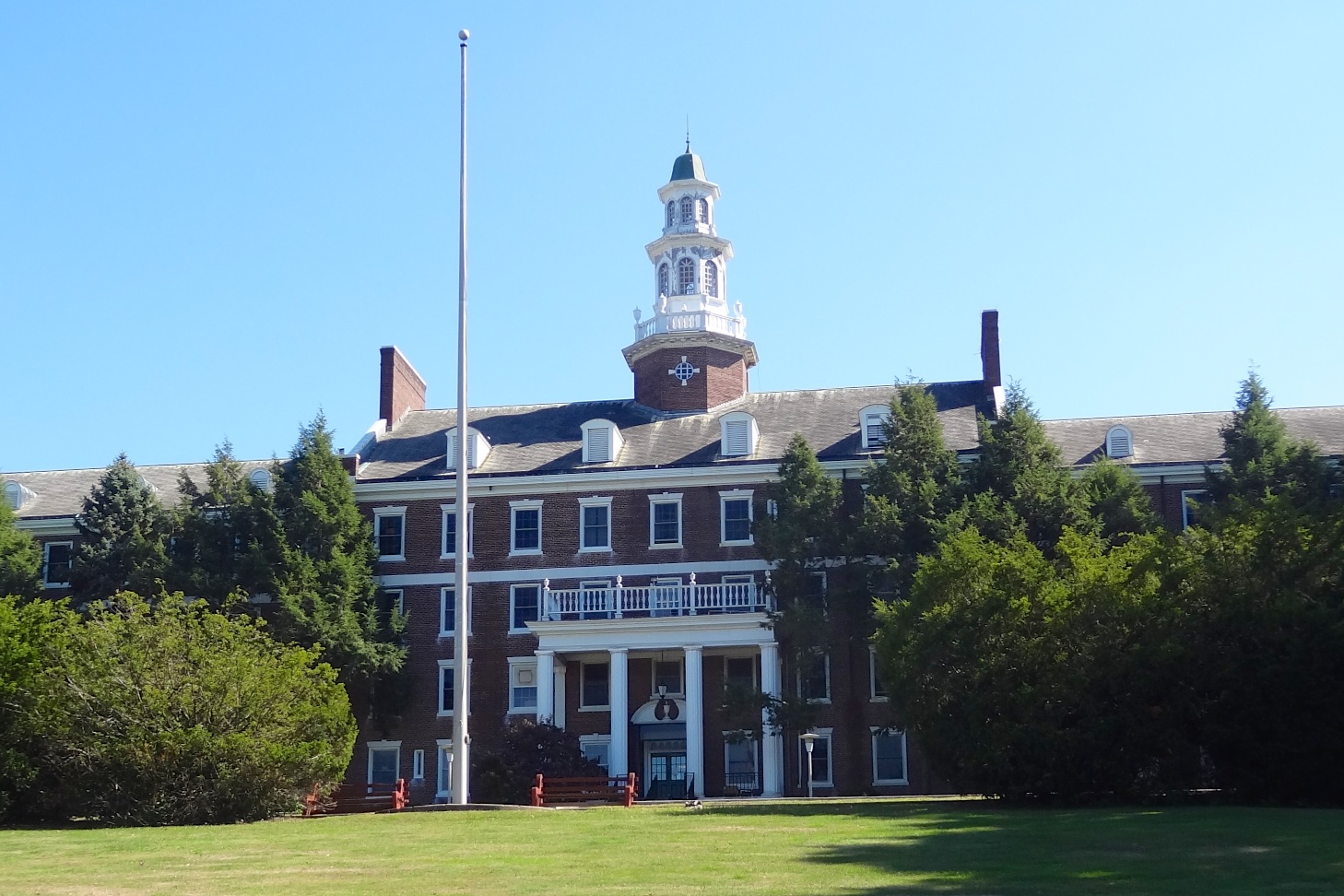
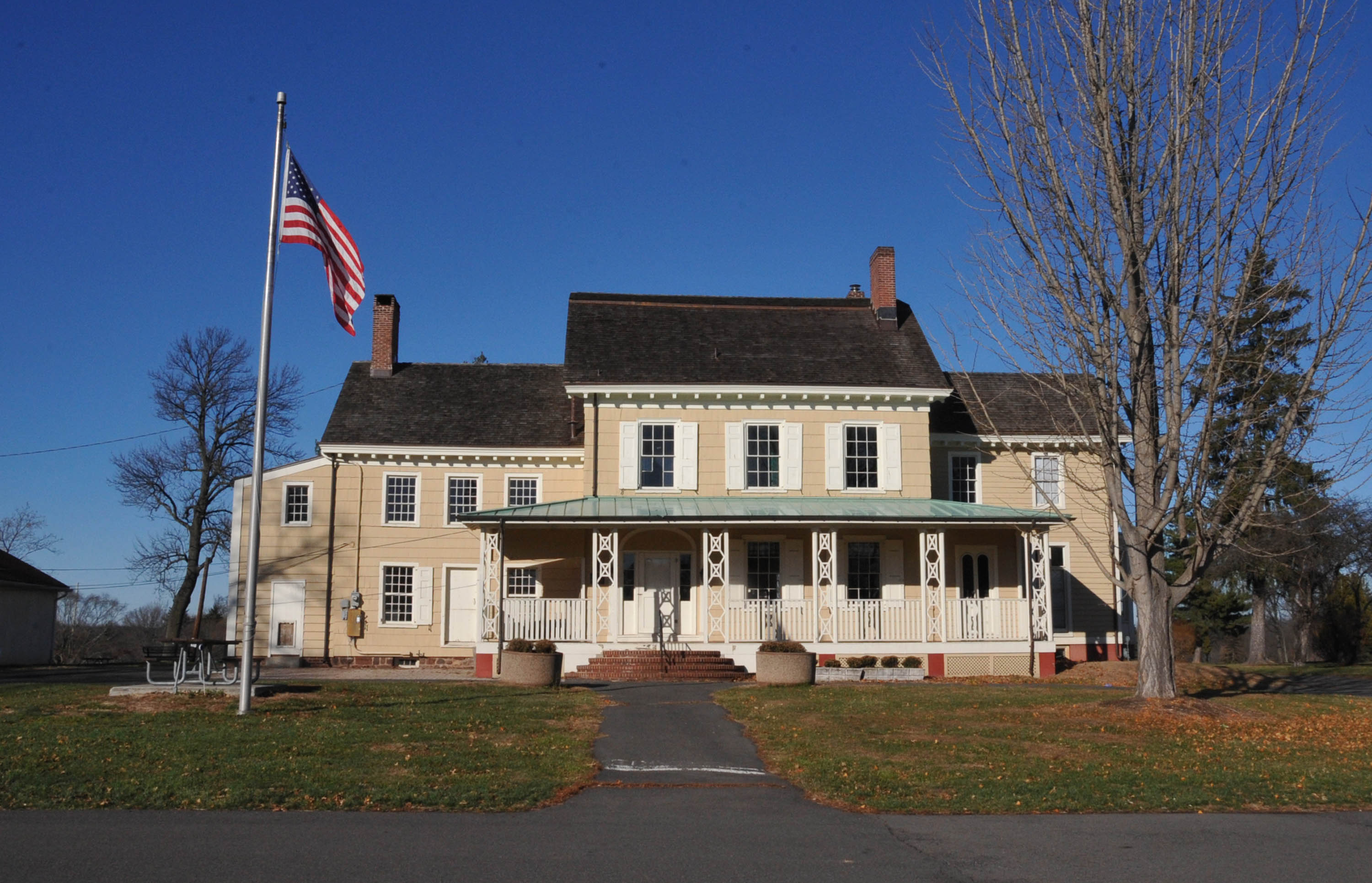
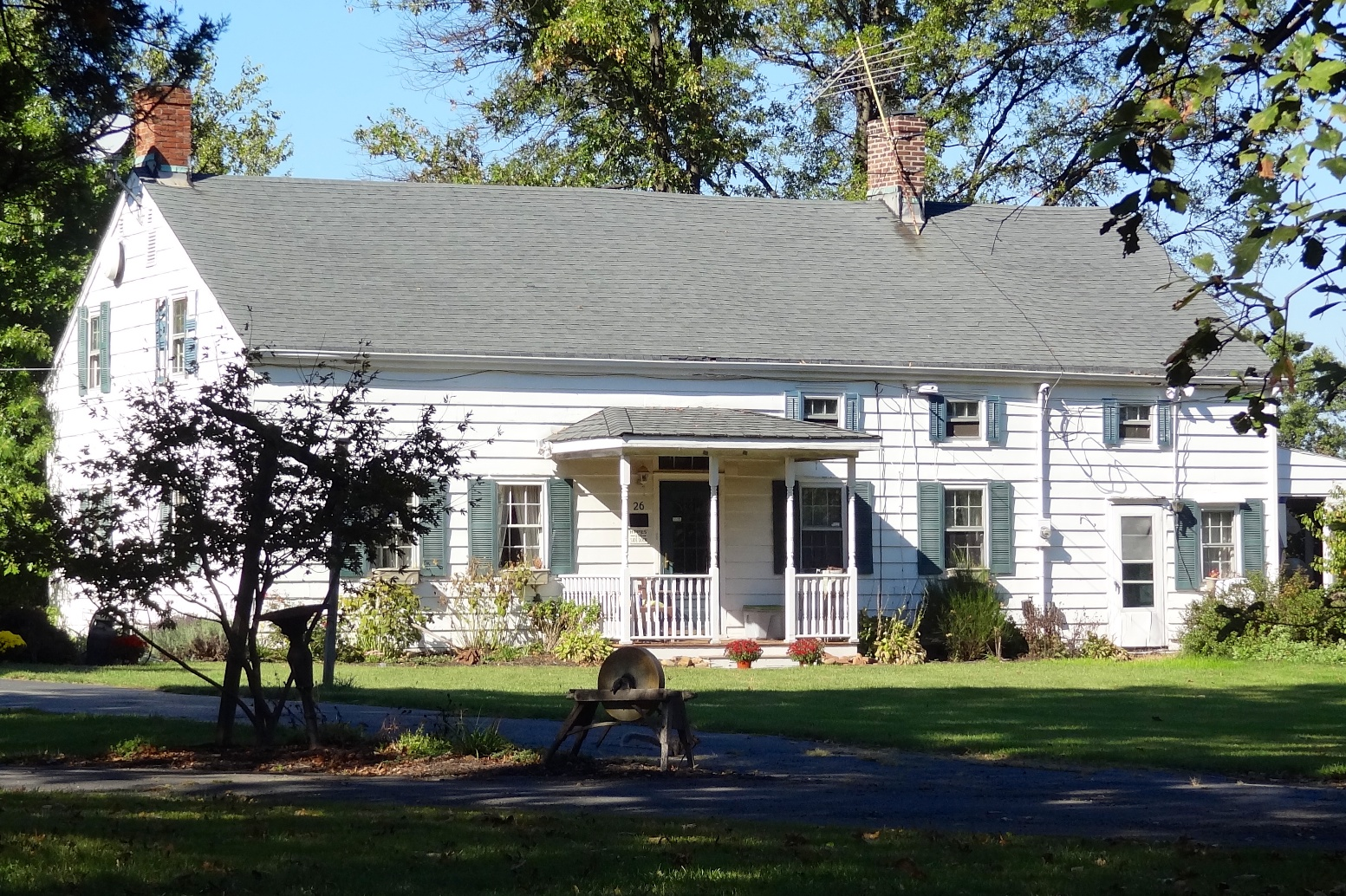
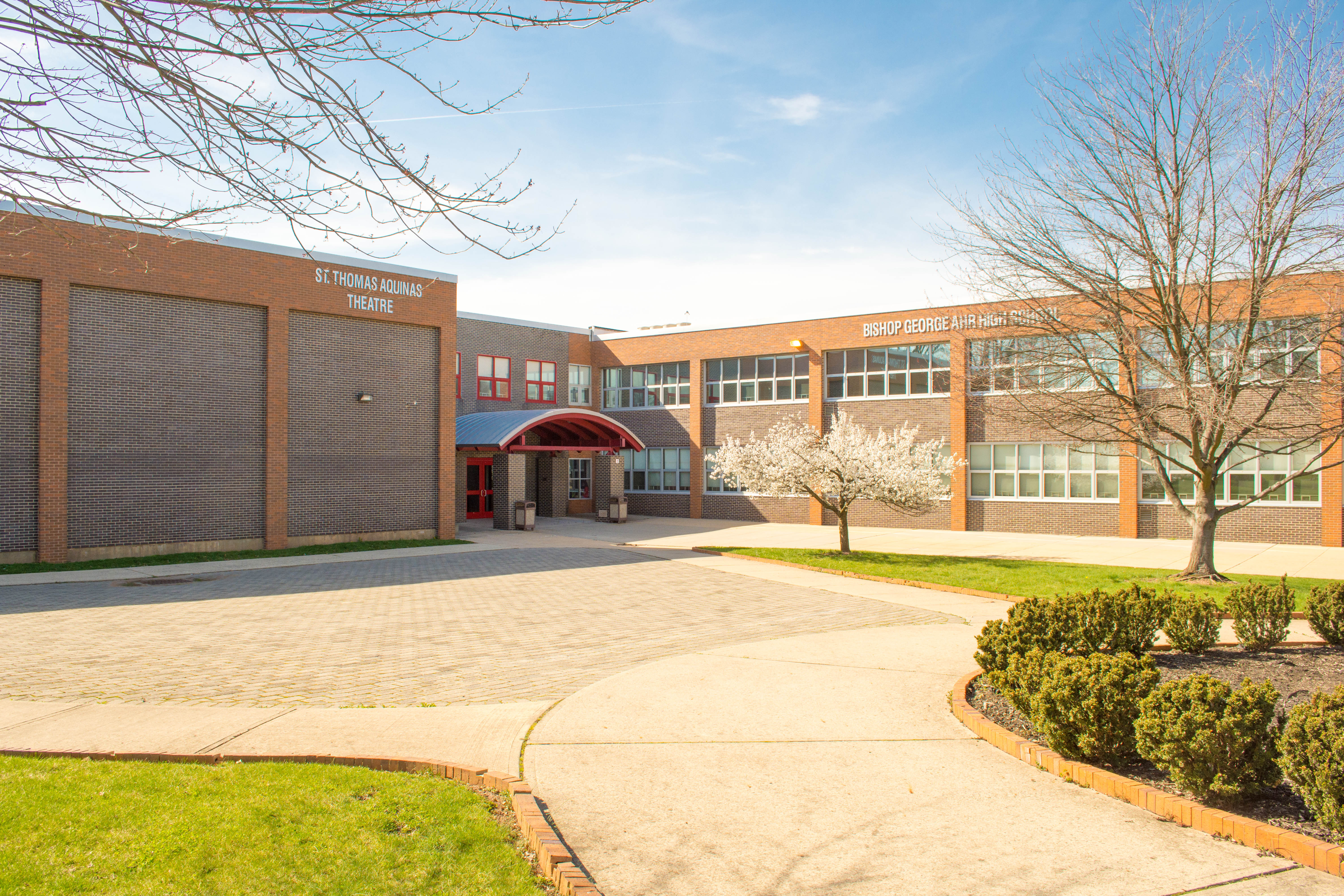
- Edison Tower Edison station JFK Medical Center Little India Menlo Park Mall Roosevelt Hospital Homestead Farm at Oak Ridge Benjamin Shotwell House St. Thomas Aquinas High School

- Flag Seal
- Nickname: "Birthplace of the Modern World"
- Motto(s): "Let There Be Light" "Birthplace of Recorded Sound"
- Location of Edison in Middlesex County highlighted in red (left). Inset map: Location of Middlesex County in New Jersey highlighted in orange (right).

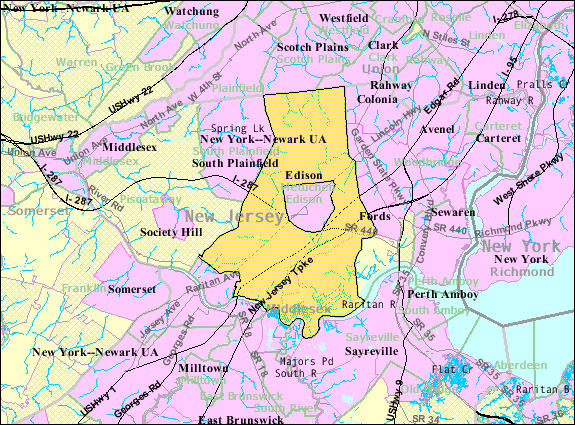
- Census Bureau map of Edison, New Jersey
- Interactive map of Edison, New Jersey
- Location in Middlesex County Location in New Jersey Location in the United States
- Coordinates: 40.5274°N 74.3933°W
- Country: United States
- State: New Jersey
- County: Middlesex
- Settled: 1651
- Incorporated: March 17, 1870 (as Raritan Township)
- Renamed: November 10, 1954 (as Edison Township)
- Named for: Thomas Edison

Government
  - Type: Faulkner Act Mayor-Council
  - Body: Township Council
  - Mayor: Samip Joshi (D, term ends December 31, 2029)
  - Administrator: Sonia Alves-Viveiros
  - Municipal clerk: Cheryl Russomanno

Area
  - Total: 30.69 sq mi (79.49 km^{2})
  - Land: 30.06 sq mi (77.86 km^{2})
  - Water: 0.63 sq mi (1.63 km^{2}) 2.05%
  - Rank: 88th of 565 in state 4th of 25 in county
- Elevation: 39 ft (12 m)

Population (2020)
  - Total: 107,588
  - Estimate (2023): 106,836
  - Rank: 6th of 565 in state 1st of 25 in county
  - Density: 3,578.2/sq mi (1,381.6/km^{2})
  - Rank: 187th of 565 in state 14th of 25 in county
- Time zone: UTC−05:00 (Eastern (EST))
  - Summer (DST): UTC−04:00 (Eastern (EDT))
- ZIP Codes: 08817, 08818, 08820, 08837, 08899
- Area codes: 732 and 908
- FIPS code: 3402320230
- GNIS feature ID: 0882166
- Website: www.edisonnj.org

Edison is a township in Middlesex County, New Jersey, United States. Situated in Central New Jersey within the core of the state's Raritan Valley region, Edison is a commercial hub (home to Menlo Park Mall and Little India) and is a bedroom community of New York City within the New York metropolitan area.

As of the 2020 United States census, the township was the state's sixth-most-populous municipality, with a population of 107,588, an increase of 7,621 (+7.6%) from the 2010 census count of 99,967, which in turn reflected an increase of 2,280 (+2.3%) from the 97,687 counted in the 2000 census.

What is now Edison Township was originally incorporated as Raritan Township by an act of the New Jersey Legislature on March 17, 1870, from portions of both Piscataway and Woodbridge Township. The township was originally named after the Raritan indigenous people. Portions of the township were taken to form Metuchen on March 20, 1900, and Highland Park on March 15, 1905. The name was officially changed to Edison Township on November 10, 1954, in honor of inventor Thomas Edison, who had his main laboratory in the Menlo Park section of the township.

== History ==
=== Early history ===
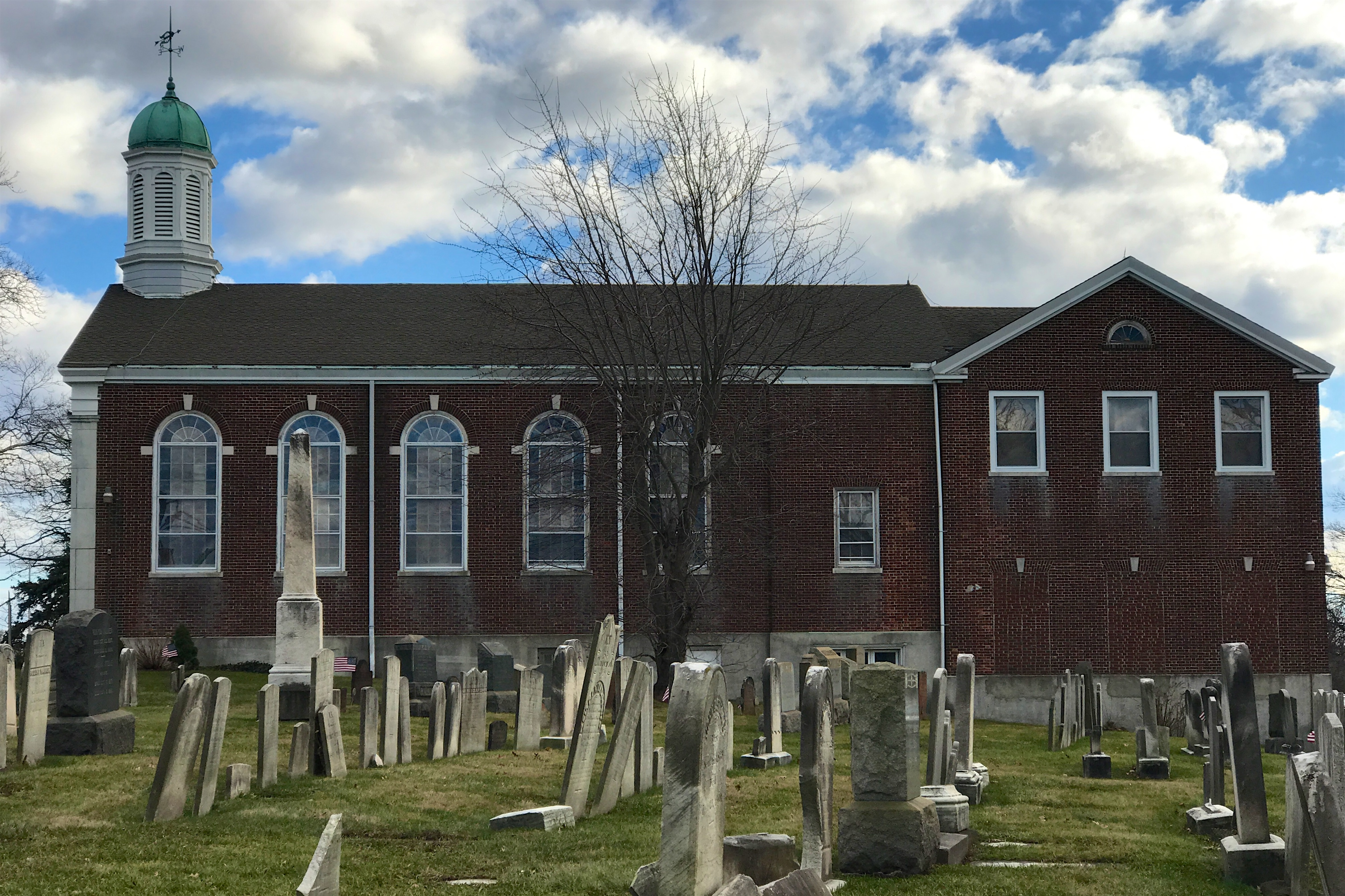
Stelton Baptist Church and Cemetery, the second oldest Baptist Church in New Jersey and the tenth oldest in the United States.

The earliest residents of the area were the Raritan people of the Lenape Native Americans, who lived there and traveled through it to the shore. In 1646, Chief Matouchin led a group of 1,200 warriors.

Edison Township, which was formed from sections of Piscataway and Woodbridge townships, was settled (by Europeans) in the 17th century. The earliest village was Piscatawaytown, which is centered around St. James Church and the Piscatawaytown Common, near the intersection of Plainfield and Woodbridge Avenues in South Edison. The Laing House of Plainfield Plantation (listed on the National Register in 1988), the Benjamin Shotwell House (listed 1987) and the Homestead Farm at Oak Ridge (listed 1995), are buildings from the colonial era included in National Register of Historic Places listings in Middlesex County.

The community was previously known as "Raritan Township", not to be confused with the current-day Raritan Township in Hunterdon County.

=== The Edison era ===
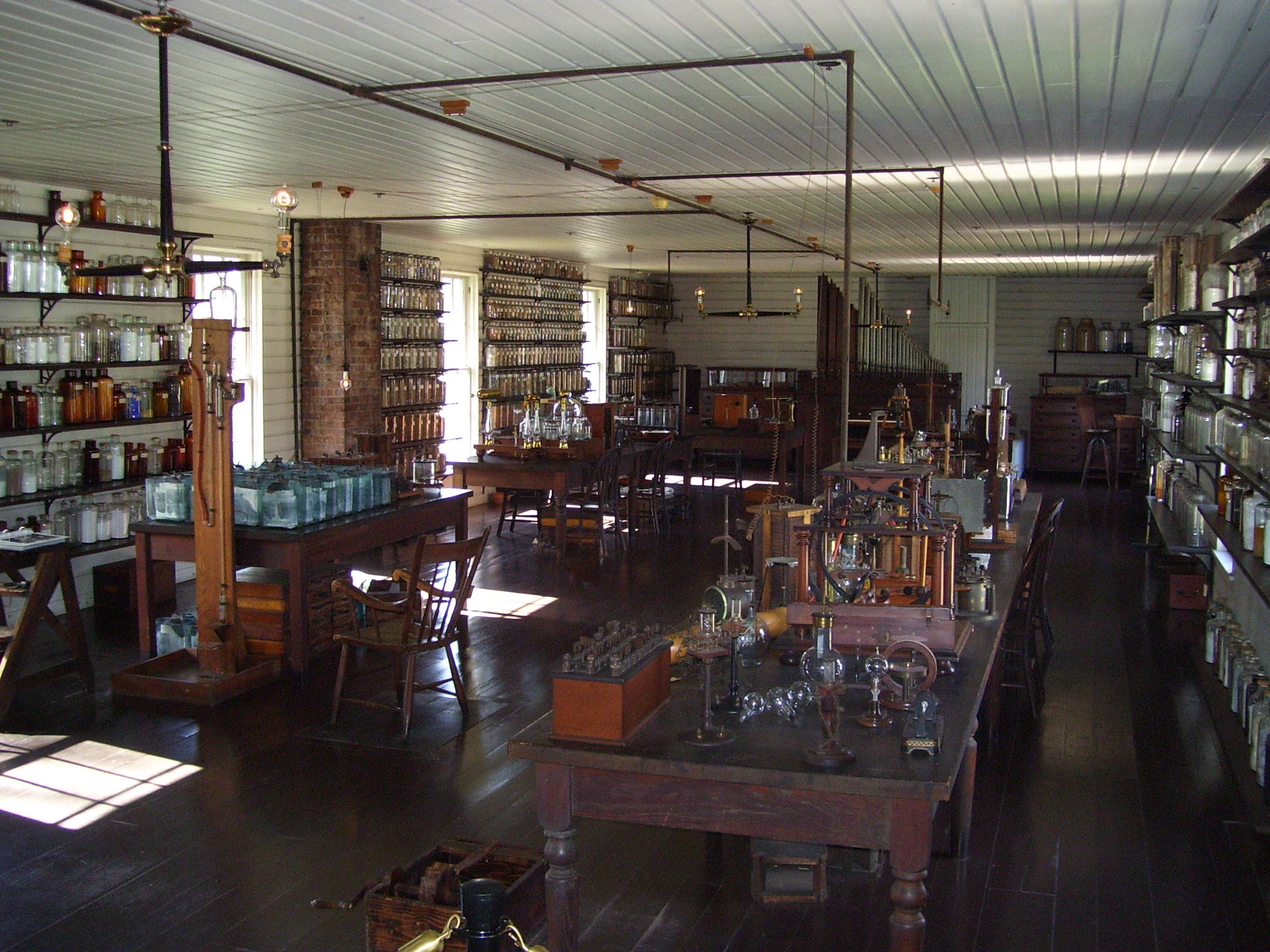
Replica of Edison's lab where he invented the first commercially practical light bulb. Henry Ford, Edison's longtime friend, built it at the Henry Ford Museum in Michigan.

In 1876, Thomas Edison set up his home and research laboratory in New Jersey on the site of an unsuccessful real estate development in Raritan Township called "Menlo Park", (currently located in Edison State Park). While there, he earned the nickname "the Wizard of Menlo Park". Before his death at age 83 in 1931, the prolific inventor amassed a record 1,093 patents for creations including the phonograph, a stock ticker, the motion-picture camera, the incandescent light bulb, a mechanical vote counter, the alkaline storage battery, including one for an electric car, and the first commercial electric light.

The Menlo Park lab was significant in that it was one of the first laboratories to pursue practical, commercial applications of research. It was in his Menlo Park laboratory that Thomas Edison came up with the phonograph and a commercially viable incandescent light bulb filament. Christie Street was the first street in the world to use electric lights for illumination. Edison subsequently left Menlo Park and moved his home and laboratory to West Orange in 1886.

=== 20th century ===
Near Piscatawaytown village, a portion of the township was informally known as "Nixon", after Lewis Nixon, a manufacturer and community leader. Soon after the outbreak of World War I, Nixon established a massive, volatile-chemical processing facility there, known as the Nixon Nitration Works. It was the site of the 1924 Nixon Nitration Works disaster, a massive explosion and resulting fire that killed 20 people and destroyed several square miles of the township.

In 1954, the township's name was changed to honor inventor Thomas A. Edison. Also on the ballot in 1954 was a failed proposal to change the community's name to Nixon.

In 1959, the Menlo Park Mall, a two-level super regional shopping mall, opened on U.S. Route 1.

=== 21st century ===
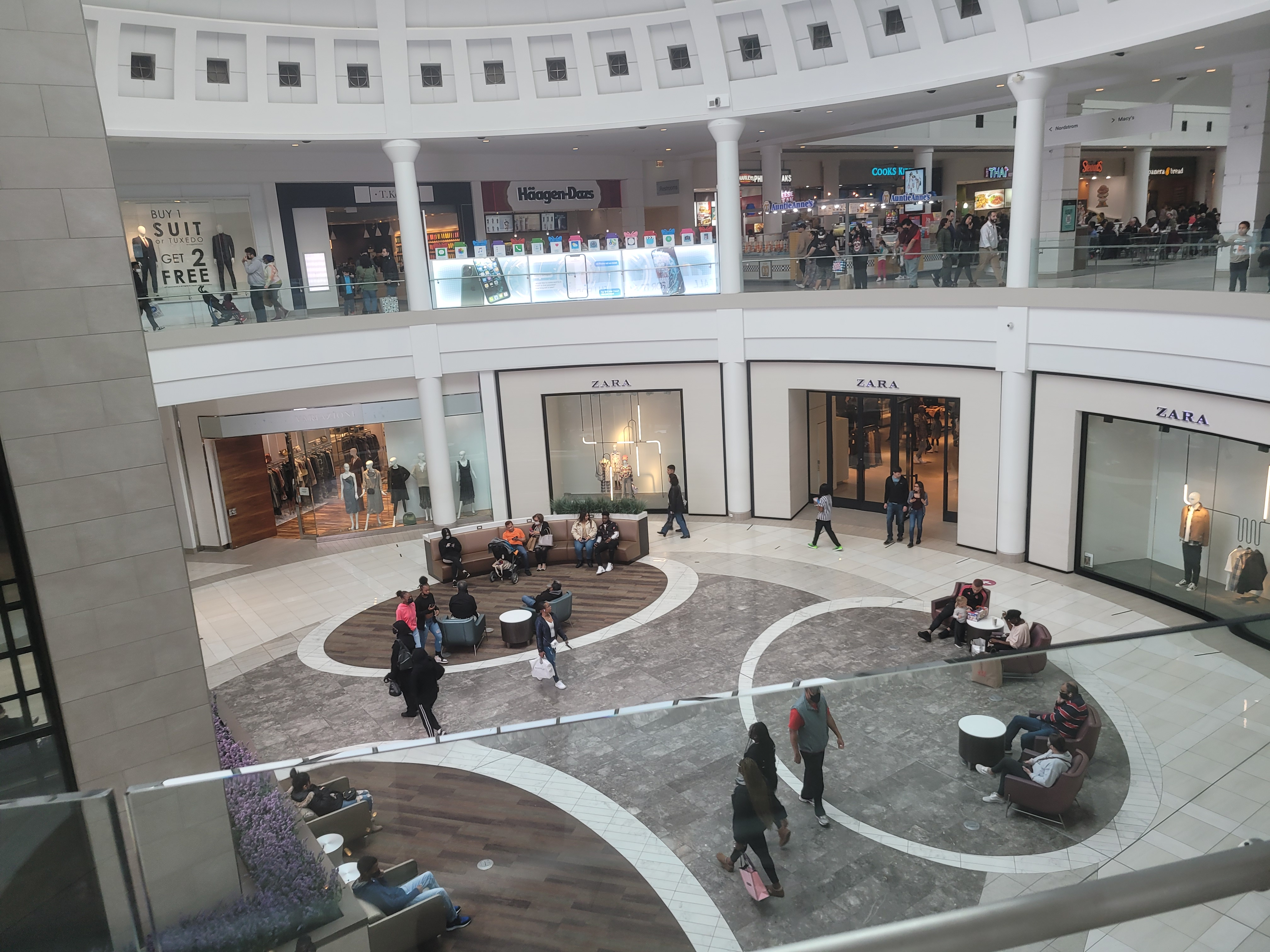
Menlo Park Mall

Edison has been one of the fastest-growing municipalities in New Jersey. As of the 2000 United States census, it was the fifth most-populated municipality in the state, after the cities of Newark, Jersey City, Paterson, and Elizabeth.

Edison is primarily a middle-class community with more than 75 ethnic communities represented. Edison has a large Jewish community near Highland Park, with multiple synagogues. Edison also has a growing Indian community and some temples that serve its religious needs. Reflecting the number of Edison's residents from India and China, the township has sister city arrangements with Shijiazhuang, China, and Baroda, India.

Edison was ranked the 28th most-livable small city in the United States by CNN Money magazine, and second in New Jersey in 2006 in Money magazine's "Best Places To Live". In 2008, two years later, Money ranked the township 35th out of the top 100 places to live in the United States. In the 2006 survey of America's Safest Cities, the township was ranked 23rd, out of 371 cities included nationwide, in the 13th annual Morgan Quitno survey. In 2009, Edison was ranked as one of "America's 10 Best Places to Grow Up" by U.S. News & World Report. The rankings focused on low crime, strong schools, green spaces, and an abundance of recreational activities. In 2014, parenting.com ranked Edison as the top safest city in America.

== Geography ==
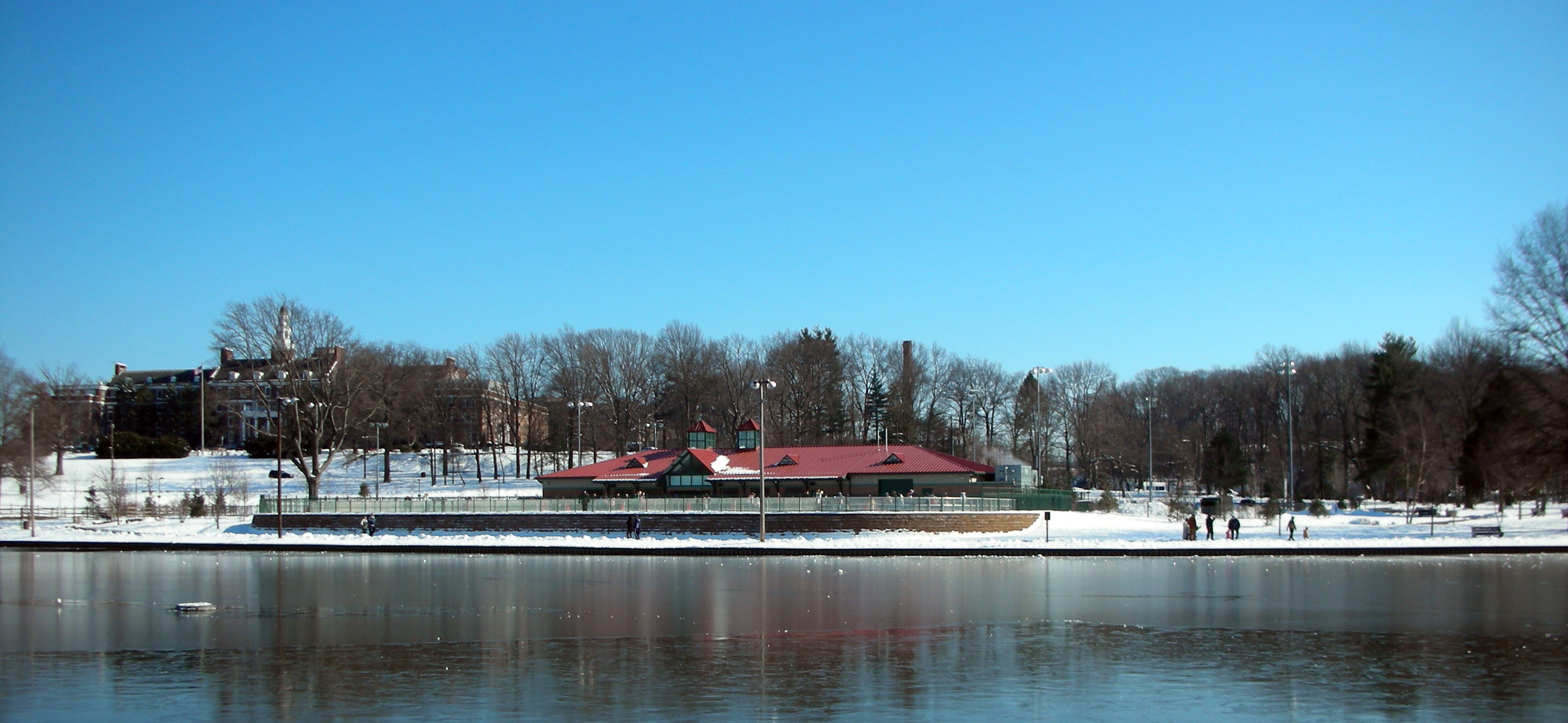
Roosevelt Park in Edison

According to the United States Census Bureau, the township had a total area of 30.69 square miles (79.49 km^{2}), including 30.06 square miles (77.86 km^{2}) of land and 0.63 square miles (1.63 km^{2}) of water (2.05%).

Edison is on the east side of Raritan Valley (a line of communities in central New Jersey), along with Plainfield, and surrounds the borough of Metuchen, making it part of 21 pairs of "doughnut towns" in the state, where one municipality surrounds another. The township borders the municipalities of East Brunswick, Highland Park, New Brunswick, Piscataway, Sayreville, South Plainfield and Woodbridge Township in Middlesex County; Clark, Plainfield and Scotch Plains in Union County.

Edison has numerous sections and neighborhoods. Unincorporated communities, localities and place names located partially or completely within the township include Bonhamtown, Briarwood East, Camp Kilmer, Centerville, Clara Barton, Eggert Mills, Greensand, Haven Homes, Lahiere, Lincoln Park, Lindenau, Martins Landing, Menlo Park, Millville, New Dover, New Durham, Nixon, North Edison, Oak Tree, Phoenix, Potters, Pumptown, Raritan Arsenal, Raritan Manor, Sand Hills, Silver Lake, Stelton, Stephenville, Valentine, and Washington Park.

Edison is about halfway between Midtown Manhattan, and New Jersey's capitol, Trenton, being about 27 miles (43 km) from each.

While the township's topography is mostly flat, there are some hillier areas, especially along the Perth Amboy Moraine, which forms an arc across the township, left by the southern limit of the Laurentide ice sheet. The highest point is on Grandview Avenue, which reaches a maximum elevation of about 220 feet (67 m). The lowest elevation in the township is at sea level on the Raritan River.

The Robinsons Branch of the Rahway River flows through Edison en route to the Robinson's Branch Reservoir.

=== Climate ===
Extreme temperatures in Edison have ranged from −17 °F (−27 °C), recorded in February 1934, to 106 °F (41 °C), recorded in July 1936 and August 1949.

According to the Köppen Climate Classification system, Edison has a humid subtropical climate (Cfa), with abundant rainfall year-round, though late summer months tend to receive more rain. Summers tend to be hot and humid with frequent rain, and winters tend to be cool to cold, with snowfall an annual occurrence, falling multiple times each winter.

Climate data for Edison, New Jersey
| Month | Jan | Feb | Mar | Apr | May | Jun | Jul | Aug | Sep | Oct | Nov | Dec | Year |
|---|---|---|---|---|---|---|---|---|---|---|---|---|---|
| Record high °F (°C) | 73 (23) | 76 (24) | 88 (31) | 97 (36) | 99 (37) | 101 (38) | 106 (41) | 106 (41) | 105 (41) | 94 (34) | 86 (30) | 77 (25) | 106 (41) |
| Mean daily maximum °F (°C) | 39 (4) | 42 (6) | 51 (11) | 62 (17) | 72 (22) | 81 (27) | 86 (30) | 84 (29) | 77 (25) | 66 (19) | 55 (13) | 43 (6) | 63 (17) |
| Daily mean °F (°C) | 31 (−1) | 33 (1) | 42 (6) | 51 (11) | 61 (16) | 70 (21) | 75 (24) | 74 (23) | 66 (19) | 55 (13) | 45 (7) | 35 (2) | 53 (12) |
| Mean daily minimum °F (°C) | 23 (−5) | 25 (−4) | 32 (0) | 41 (5) | 50 (10) | 60 (16) | 65 (18) | 63 (17) | 56 (13) | 44 (7) | 36 (2) | 28 (−2) | 44 (6) |
| Record low °F (°C) | −8 (−22) | −17 (−27) | 1 (−17) | 18 (−8) | 29 (−2) | 37 (3) | 44 (7) | 40 (4) | 31 (−1) | 22 (−6) | 9 (−13) | −7 (−22) | −17 (−27) |
| Average precipitation inches (mm) | 4.02 (102) | 3.02 (77) | 4.10 (104) | 3.94 (100) | 4.71 (120) | 3.97 (101) | 5.39 (137) | 4.34 (110) | 4.54 (115) | 3.80 (97) | 4.04 (103) | 3.76 (96) | 49.63 (1,261) |

== Demographics ==
=== Asian community ===
Edison is home to one of the region's main centers of Asian American cultural diversity. The township was 50.0% ethnically Asian by population as of the 2020 Census.

==== Indian community ====
Oak Tree Road is a South Asian-focused commercial strip in Middlesex County, the U.S. county with the highest concentration of Indians in the New York City metropolitan region. The Oak Tree Road strip runs for about one-and-a-half miles through Edison and neighboring Iselin in Woodbridge Township, near the area's sprawling Chinatown and Koreatown, running along New Jersey Route 27. It is the largest and most diverse South Asian cultural hub in the United States. In Middlesex County, election ballots are printed in English, Spanish, Gujarati, Hindi, and Punjabi. As part of the 2020 Census, 34.9% of Edison residents identified themselves as being Indian American, an increase from 28.3% in 2010. In the 2000 Census, 17.75% of Edison residents identified themselves as being Indian American, the highest percentage of Indian-American people of any municipality in the United States with 1,000 or more residents identifying their ancestry. The Oak Tree Road corridor also serves as a focal point for South Asian cultural life in New Jersey, with annual Navratri Garba dances, Diwali street festivals, and other community celebrations drawing large crowds. The nearby New Jersey Convention and Exposition Center in Raritan Center frequently hosts Indian cultural expos and wedding conventions, further highlighting the township's role as a hub of South Asian commerce and culture. Edison is also home to numerous Hindu temples, Sikh gurdwaras, and mosques that serve the township's South Asian population, alongside community media such as TV Asia, one of the first 24-hour South Asian television networks in the United States. The township's demographic concentration has also made Oak Tree Road a frequent campaign stop for political candidates seeking to engage Indian American voters.

==== Chinese community ====
Edison also has a significant Chinese population. The town contains several Chinese-language schools and cultural associations. The area near the borders with Highland Park and the Livingston Campus at Rutgers University in Piscataway, has some Chinese food establishments, including Kam Man Food, 99 Ranch Market, and various dim sum, dumpling, dessert, and tea shops as well as the pan-Asian Korean-founded supermarket, H Mart. Other Chinese operations in Edison include Sino Monthly magazine and Chinese News Weekly.

The township's Lunar New Year parade typically travels northbound from Division Street to festivities in Papaianni Park by the lake and township municipal building.

=== Jewish community ===
Edison is also home to a large Jewish community, especially Orthodox. The world's largest gathering of rabbis outside Israel took place at the New Jersey Convention and Exposition Center in December 2024.

=== Historical population ===
Historical population
| Census | Pop. | Note | %± |
|---|---|---|---|
| 1870 | 3,460 | | — |
| 1880 | 3,789 | | 9.5% |
| 1890 | 3,018 | | −20.3% |
| 1900 | 2,801 | * | −7.2% |
| 1910 | 2,707 | * | −3.4% |
| 1920 | 5,419 | | 100.2% |
| 1930 | 10,025 | | 85.0% |
| 1940 | 11,470 | | 14.4% |
| 1950 | 16,348 | | 42.5% |
| 1960 | 44,799 | | 174.0% |
| 1970 | 67,120 | | 49.8% |
| 1980 | 70,193 | | 4.6% |
| 1990 | 88,680 | | 26.3% |
| 2000 | 97,687 | | 10.2% |
| 2010 | 99,967 | | 2.3% |
| 2020 | 107,588 | | 7.6% |
| 2023 (est.) | 106,836 | | −0.7% |
Population sources: 1870–1920; 1870 1880–1890; 1890–1910 1910–1930; 1940–2000 2000; 2010 2020 * = Lost territory during previous decade.

=== 2020 census ===
Edison, New Jersey – Racial and ethnic composition Note: the US Census treats Hispanic/Latino as an ethnic category. This table excludes Latinos from the racial categories and assigns them to a separate category. Hispanics/Latinos may be of any race.
| Race / Ethnicity (NH = Non-Hispanic) | Pop 1990 | Pop 2000 | Pop 2010 | Pop 2020 | % 1990 | % 2000 | % 2010 | % 2020 |
|---|---|---|---|---|---|---|---|---|
| White alone (NH) | 67,919 | 54,461 | 39,577 | 28,304 | 76.59% | 55.75% | 39.59% | 26.31% |
| Black or African American alone (NH) | 4,784 | 6,458 | 6,631 | 7,764 | 5.39% | 6.61% | 6.56% | 7.22% |
| Native American or Alaska Native alone (NH) | 95 | 85 | 186 | 219 | 0.11% | 0.09% | 0.19% | 0.20% |
| Asian alone (NH) | 11,983 | 28,541 | 43,092 | 57,687 | 13.51% | 29.22% | 43.11% | 53.62% |
| Pacific Islander alone (NH) | N/A | 31 | 31 | 27 | N/A | 0.03% | 0.03% | 0.03% |
| Other race alone (NH) | 60 | 263 | 202 | 629 | 0.07% | 0.27% | 0.20% | 0.58% |
| Mixed race or Multiracial (NH) | N/A | 1,622 | 2,136 | 2,187 | N/A | 1.66% | 2.14% | 2.03% |
| Hispanic or Latino (any race) | 3,839 | 6,226 | 8,112 | 10,771 | 4.33% | 6.37% | 8.11% | 10.01% |
| Total | 88,680 | 97,687 | 99,967 | 107,588 | 100.00% | 100.00% | 100.00% | 100.00% |

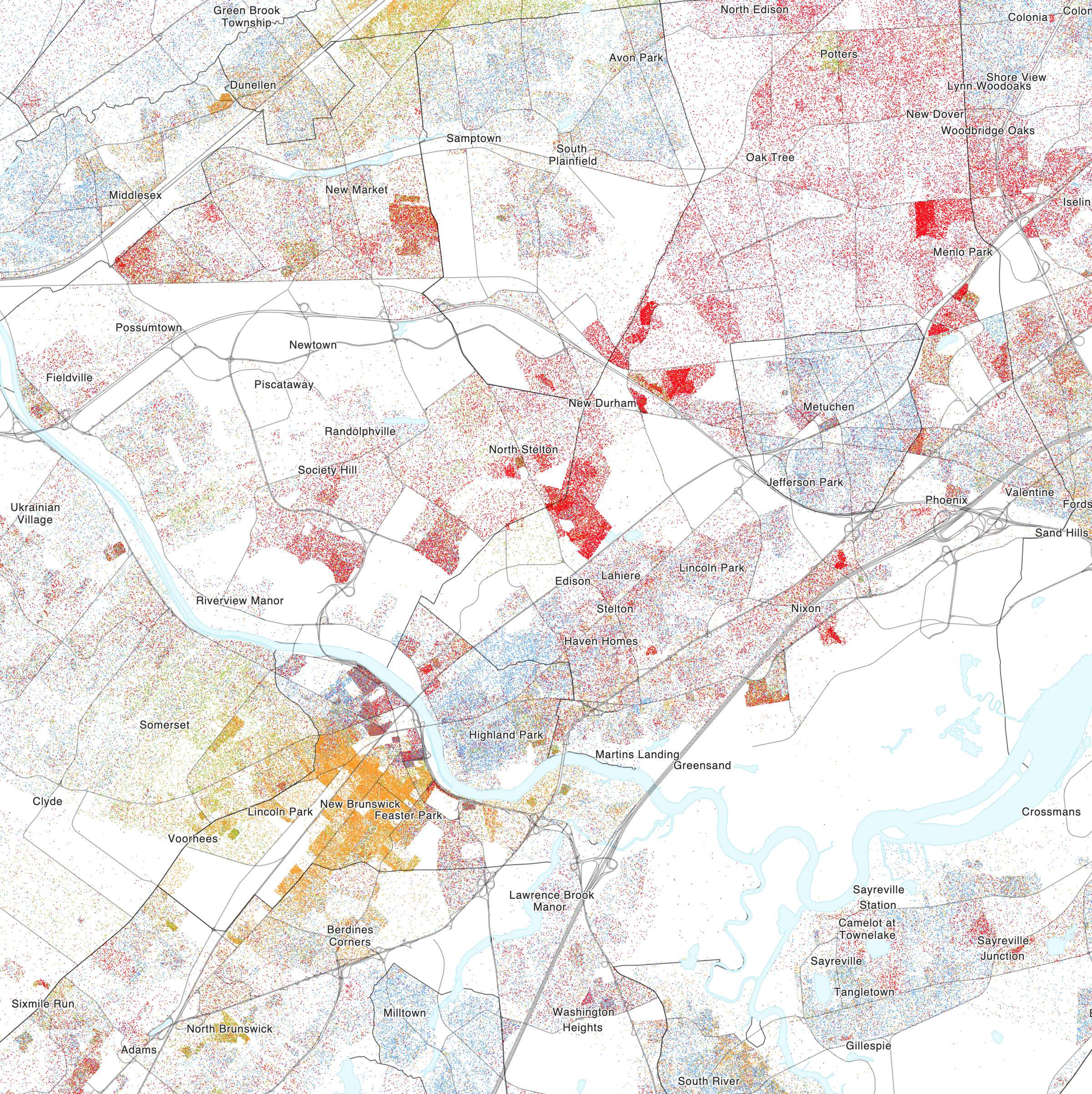
Map of racial distribution in Edison, 2020 U.S. census. Each dot is one person: ⬤ White ⬤ Black ⬤ Asian ⬤ Hispanic ⬤ Multiracial ⬤ Native American/Other

=== 2010 census ===
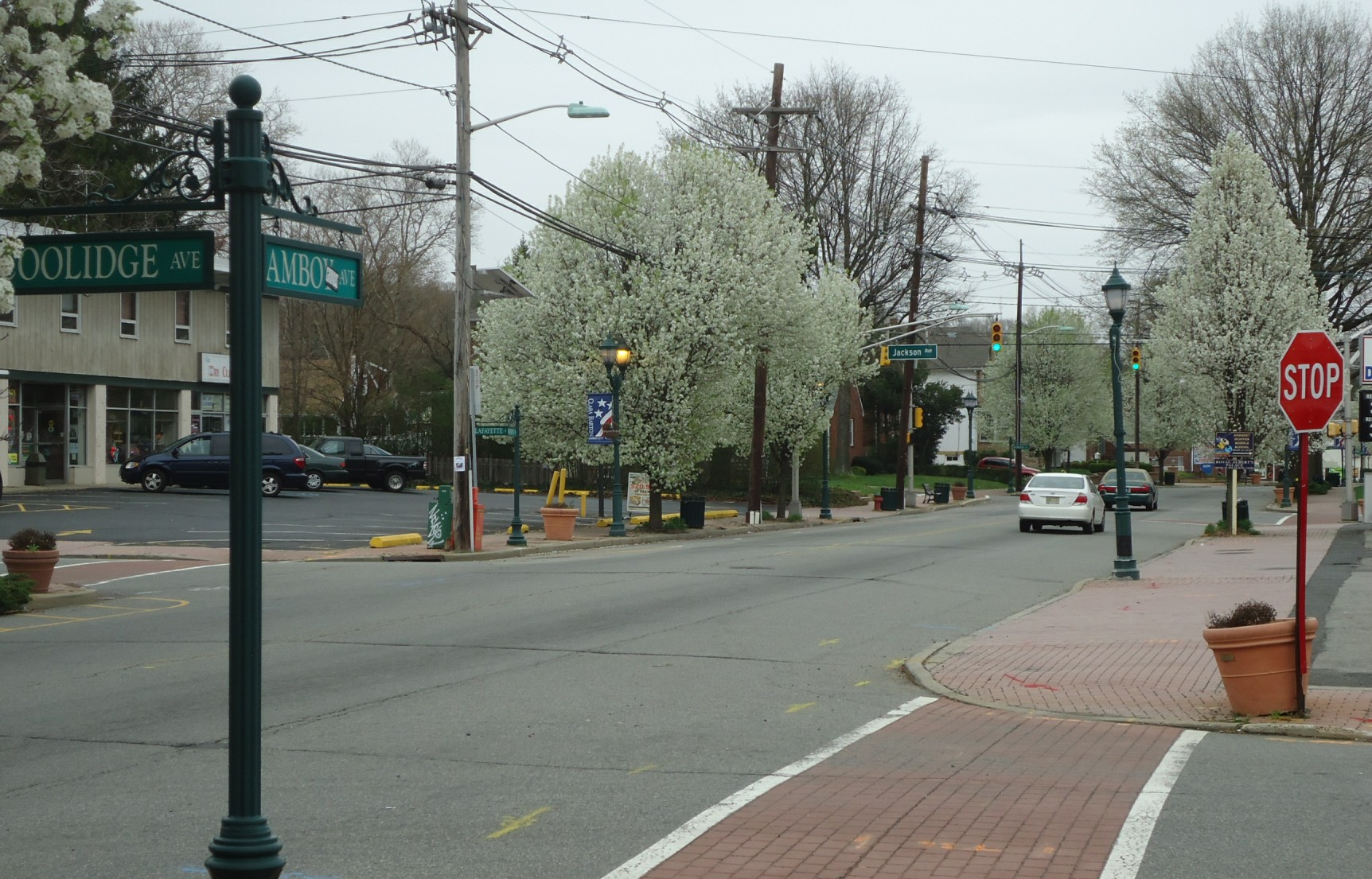
Amboy Avenue in the Clara Barton neighborhood of Edison

The 2010 United States census counted 99,967 people, 34,972 households, and 26,509 families in the township. The population density was 3,339.0 per square mile (1,289.2/km^{2}). There were 36,302 housing units at an average density of 1,212.5 per square mile (468.1/km^{2}). The racial makeup was 44.10% (44,084) White, 7.05% (7,046) Black or African American, 0.23% (229) Native American, 43.19% (43,177) Asian, 0.04% (36) Pacific Islander, 2.72% (2,718) from other races, and 2.68% (2,677) from two or more races. Hispanic or Latino residents of any race were 8.11% (8,112) of the population.

Of the 34,972 households, 36.4% had children under the age of 18; 62.3% were married couples living together; 9.6% had a female householder with no husband present, and 24.2% were non-families. Of all households, 20.4% were made up of individuals, and 7.9% had someone living alone who was 65 years of age or older. The average household size was 2.80, and the average family size was 3.26.

22.7% of the population was under the age of 18, 7.6% from 18 to 24, 30.1% from 25 to 44, 27.0% from 45 to 64, and 12.6% who were 65 years of age or older. The median age was 38.1 years. For every 100 females, the population had 95.8 males. For every 100 females ages 18 and older, there were 93.8 males.

The Census Bureau's 2006–2010 American Community Survey showed that (in 2010 inflation-adjusted dollars) median household income was $86,725 (with a margin of error of +/− $3,000) and the median family income was $100,008 (+/− $2,624). Males had a median income of $66,898 (+/− $4,094) versus $50,953 (+/− $1,462) for females. The per capita income for the township was $36,464 (+/− $1,184). About 3.5% of families and 7.2% of the population were below the poverty line, including 8.6% of those under age 18 and 6.3% of those age 65 or over.

=== 2000 census ===
As of the 2000 United States census there were 97,687 people, 35,136 households, and 25,881 families residing in the township. The population density was 3,243.0 inhabitants per square mile (1,252.1/km^{2}). There were 36,018 housing units at an average density of 1,195.7 per square mile (461.7/km^{2}). The racial makeup of the township was 59.49% White, 29.27% Asian, 6.89% African American, 0.14% Native American, .04% Pacific Islander, 2.02% from other races, and 2.15% from two or more races. 6.37% of the population were Hispanic or Latino of any race.

There were 35,136 households, out of which 34.3% had children under the age of 18 living in them, 61.1% were married couples living together, 9.1% had a female householder with no husband present, and 26.3% were non-families. 21.1% of all households were made up of individuals, and 7.2% had someone living alone who was 65 years of age or older. The average household size was 2.72, and the average family size was 3.19.

In the township, 22.9% of the population was under the age of 18, 7.8% was from 18 to 24, 34.0% from 25 to 44, 23.4% from 45 to 64, and 11.9% was 65 years of age or older. The median age was 36 years. For every 100 females, there were 96.3 males. For every 100 females age 18 and over, there were 94.0 males.

The median household income in the township is $69,746, and the median income for a family was $77,976. Males had a median income of $53,303 versus $36,829 for females. The per capita income for the township was $30,148. About 3.3% of families and 4.8% of the population were below the poverty line, including 4.3% of those under age 18 and 6.3% of those age 65 or over.

== Economy ==
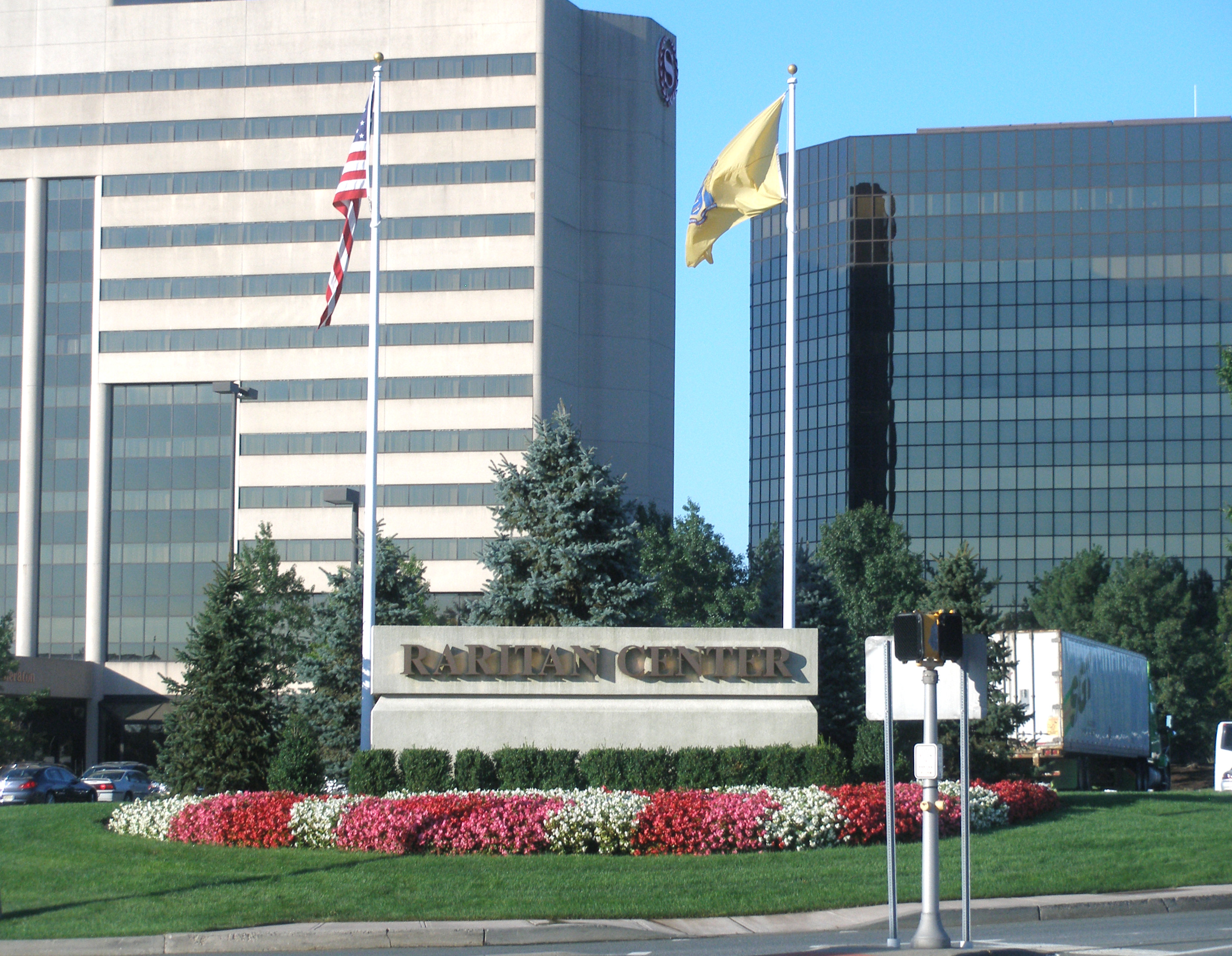
Raritan Center is a 2,300-acre (930 ha) business park.

=== Manufacturing ===
Some production facilities in and around the area, including Edison Assembly, Ford Motor Company's production plant for Rangers, Mustangs, Pintos, Mercurys, and Lincolns. Other notable companies included Frigidaire's air-conditioner plant in Edison, Siemens in Edison.

Starting in the 2000s, manufacturing began to leave Central Jersey, with many facilities closing and relocating overseas. The Ford plant was demolished by 2008 and was replaced by Sam's Club, Topgolf, and Starbucks.

=== Corporate presence ===
Majesco, a video game company, has its corporate headquarters in Edison. Other companies have warehouse operations within Edison. These companies include the Italian food producer and importer Colavita, an Amazon fulfillment center, and the regional hubs for FedEx, UPS, and Newegg. In addition, Edison is home to the state's largest private convention center, the New Jersey Convention and Exposition Center, located within the Raritan Center Business Park. Raritan Center itself is the largest industrial park on the east side of the Mississippi River. The United States headquarters of the international company Zylog Systems is located in Edison, as is the headquarters of the e-commerce companies Boxed and Bare Necessities.

== Sports ==
Plainfield Country Club is a private country club that has hosted the 1987 U.S. Women's Open and The Barclays golf tournament, the first PGA Tour FedEx Cup playoff event, in both 2011 and 2015.

== Parks and recreation ==
Oak Tree Pond is the site of the Battle of Short Hills, a minor battle of the American Revolutionary War, and the conversion into a park ended a real estate development controversy.

Roosevelt Park, located between Parsonage Road and Route 1, west of the Mall, covers 196 acres (79 ha), including the 8-acre (3.2 ha) Roosevelt Park Lake. The park was established in 1917, making it the oldest county park in Middlesex County.

Edison State Park and Dismal Swamp are also located in the township.

== Government ==
=== Local government ===
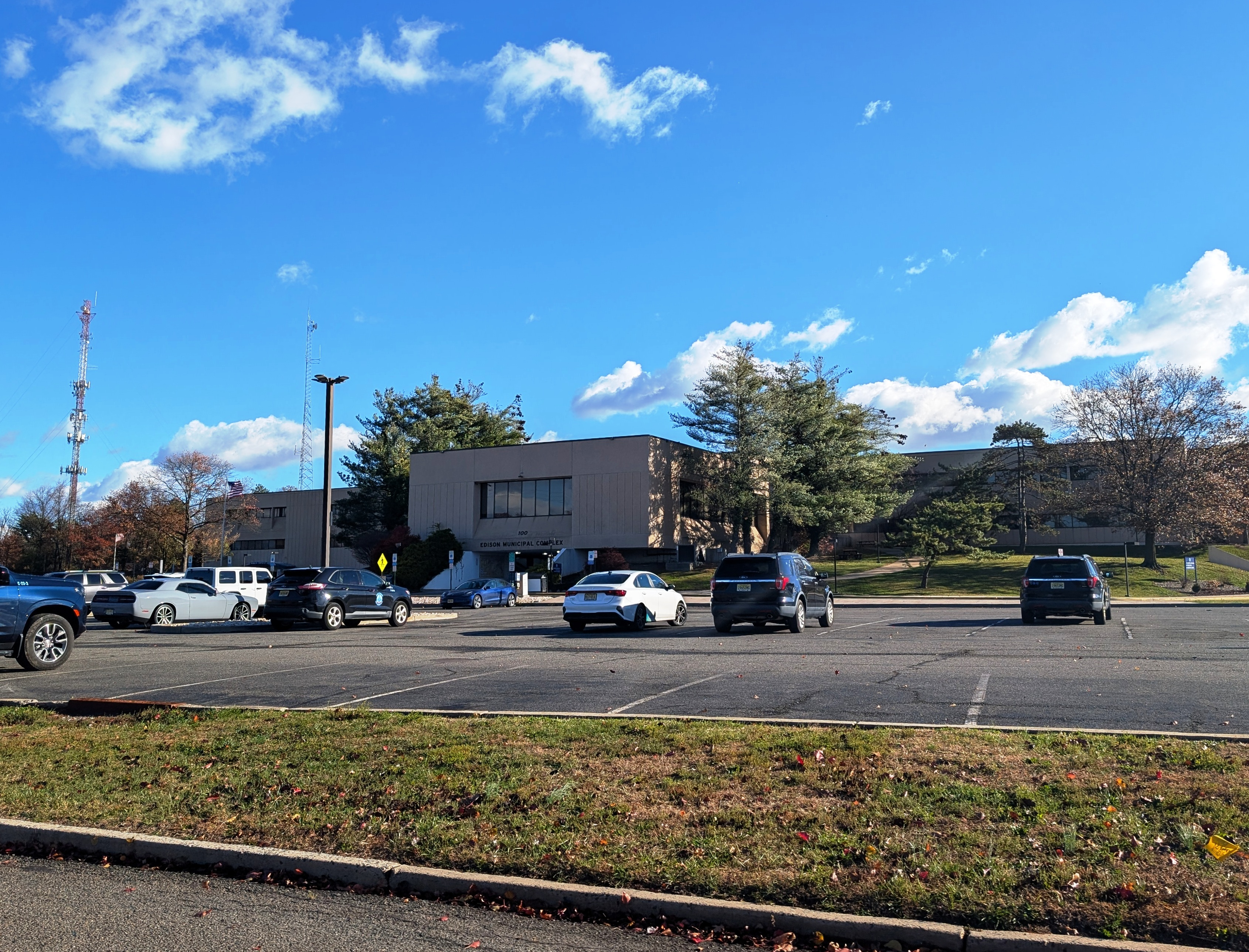
Edison Municipal Complex

Edison Township operates within the Faulkner Act, formally known as the Optional Municipal Charter Law, under the Mayor-Council form of government, which was implemented as of January 1, 1958, based on the recommendations of a Charter Study Commission. The township is one of 71 municipalities (of the 564) statewide governed under this form. Edison's governing body is comprised of the mayor and the seven-member Township Council. Members of the council are elected at-large in partisan elections held as part of the November general election to four-year terms of office on a staggered basis, with three or four seats coming up for election in odd-numbered years, with the mayoral seat up for vote at the same time that three seats are expiring.

As of 2026, the Mayor of Edison is Democrat Samip "Sam" Joshi, whose term of office ends December 31, 2029. Members of the Township Council are Council President Joseph Coyle (D, 2027), Council Vice President Robert Kentos (D, 2029), Richard Brescher (D, 2027), Kelli Dima (D, 2029), Biral Patel (D, 2029), Ajay Patil (D, 2027), and Asaf Shmuel (D, 2027).

The first (and to-date, only) female mayor of Edison was Antonia "Toni" Ricigliano, whose term of office ended on December 31, 2013.

==== Election 2017 ====
Former Edison Democratic Chair and Detective Keith Hahn ran for mayor as a Republican against incumbent Mayor Thomas Lankey. Lankey was re-elected with 12,032 votes to Hahn's 8,574 votes.

==== Election 2016 ====
In June 2016, the Township Council selected Joseph Coyle from a list of three candidates nominated by the Democratic municipal committee to fill the seat expiring in December 2019 that had been held by Robert Karabinchak, until he stepped down from office to take a vacant seat in the New Jersey General Assembly. Coyle served on an interim basis until the November 2016 general election, when voters elected him to fill the balance of the term of office.

==== Election 2005 ====
Running on a good government platform and a call to reform the Democratic Party, Jun Choi won the June 2005 primary by a 56–44% margin, defeating longtime incumbent Mayor George A. Spadoro, the first time in Edison history that a challenger won the Democratic primary. An article in The American Prospect details aspects that Choi brought together in his 2005 mayoral campaign, including 1. attracting new voters into the process, 2. a good government message, 3. anti-Wal-Mart or economic justice theme and 4. an effective Internet-based progressive mobilization. In the general election, Jun Choi declared victory, leading in unofficial results with a vote of 12,126 to 11,935; a recount effort was unsuccessful. On January 1, 2006, at age 34, Choi was sworn in by Governor Jon Corzine as the youngest mayor in Edison history.

Recent politics in Edison have centered on plans to rezone the township to facilitate the creation of "walkable" communities that will attract businesses, while still maintaining open spaces, parks, and easy access to commuter transit. This strategy is meant to encourage "Smart Growth".

Politics in Edison since the 2005 mayoral election have been polarized by an attempt by retail giant Walmart to open a store in central Edison near the junction of Interstate 287 and New Jersey Route 27. Even though Jun Choi stated during his mayoral campaign that he would stop Walmart from being built, Walmart filed suit and won, and Choi was there to cut the ribbon when the store opened.

==== Law enforcement ====
The town is served by the full-time Edison Division of Police, led by Chief Thomas Bryan and employing 168 officers as of 2012, assisted by the Edison Auxiliary Police. The department is striving to overcome a history of widespread officer misconduct.

=== Federal, state, and county representation ===
Edison is located in the 6th Congressional District and is part of New Jersey's 18th state legislative district.

For the 119th United States Congress, New Jersey's 6th congressional district is represented by Frank Pallone (D, Long Branch). New Jersey is represented in the United States Senate by Democrats Cory Booker (Newark, term ends 2027) and Andy Kim (Moorestown, term ends 2031).

For the 2026–2027 session, the 18th legislative district of the New Jersey Legislature is represented in the State Senate by Patrick J. Diegnan (D, South Plainfield) and in the General Assembly by Robert Karabinchak (D, Edison) and Sterley Stanley (D, East Brunswick).

Middlesex County is governed by a Board of County Commissioners, whose seven members are elected at-large on a partisan basis to serve three-year terms of office on a staggered basis, with either two or three seats coming up for election each year as part of the November general election. At an annual reorganization meeting held in January, the board selects from among its members a commissioner director and deputy director. As of 2025, Middlesex County's Commissioners (with party affiliation, term-end year, and residence listed in parentheses) are:

Director Ronald G. Rios (D, Carteret, 2027), Deputy Director Shanti Narra (D, North Brunswick, 2027), Claribel A. "Clary" Azcona-Barber (D, New Brunswick, 2025), Charles Kenny (D, Woodbridge Township, 2025), Leslie Koppel (D, Monroe Township, 2026), Chanelle Scott McCullum (D, Piscataway, 2025) and Charles E. Tomaro (D, Edison, 2026).

Constitutional officers are: Clerk Nancy Pinkin (D, 2025, East Brunswick), Sheriff Mildred S. Scott (D, 2025, Piscataway) and Surrogate Claribel Cortes (D, 2026; North Brunswick).

=== Politics ===
As of March 2011, there were a total of 53,352 registered voters in Edison Township, of which 25,163 (47.2%) were registered as Democrats, 6,242 (11.7%) were registered as Republicans and 21,929 (41.1%) were registered as Unaffiliated. There were 18 voters registered to other parties.

United States presidential election results for Edison
| Year | Republican | | Democratic | | Third party(ies) | |
| Year | No. | % | No. | % | No. | % |
|---|---|---|---|---|---|---|
| 2024 | 17,554 | 43.51% | 21,475 | 53.23% | 1,316 | 3.26% |
| 2020 | 15,986 | 37.56% | 26,335 | 61.88% | 239 | 0.56% |
| 2016 | 13,483 | 36.22% | 22,707 | 61.01% | 1,031 | 2.77% |
| 2012 | 12,769 | 36.26% | 22,104 | 62.77% | 339 | 0.96% |
| 2008 | 14,986 | 39.63% | 22,409 | 59.26% | 418 | 1.11% |
| 2004 | 15,615 | 43.46% | 20,000 | 55.67% | 311 | 0.87% |
| 2000 | 12,228 | 37.87% | 18,943 | 58.67% | 1,119 | 3.47% |

In the 2012 presidential election, Democrat Barack Obama received 62.8% of the vote (22,104 cast), ahead of Republican Mitt Romney with 36.3% (12,769 votes), and other candidates with 1.0% (339 votes), among the 35,546 ballots cast by the township's 54,857 registered voters (334 ballots were spoiled), for a turnout of 64.8%. In the 2008 presidential election, Democrat Barack Obama received 58.8% of the vote (22,409 cast), ahead of Republican John McCain with 39.3% (14,986 votes) and other candidates with 1.1% (418 votes), among the 38,129 ballots cast by the township's 55,305 registered voters, for a turnout of 68.9%. In the 2004 presidential election, Democrat John Kerry received 55.2% of the vote (20,000 ballots cast), outpolling Republican George W. Bush with 43.1% (15,615 votes) and other candidates with 0.6% (311 votes), among the 36,205 ballots cast by the township's 52,308 registered voters, for a turnout percentage of 69.2. 2004 and 2024 were the only presidential elections where the Republican candidate got over 40.0% of the vote in the township. In the 2024 presidential election, Republican candidate Donald Trump earned the most votes, 17,554 votes, as well as the highest percentage of all votes cast, 43.5%, that the party had ever earned in Edison since at least the 2004 presidential election. Third-party candidates also earned the most votes, with 1,316 votes, and the highest percentage of all votes cast, 3.3%, in 2024, since at least that year.

Gubernatorial election results for Edison
| Year | Republican | | Democratic | | Third party(ies) | |
| Year | No. | % | No. | % | No. | % |
|---|---|---|---|---|---|---|
| 2025 | 10,364 | 32.69% | 21,068 | 66.45% | 271 | 0.85% |
| 2021 | 9,684 | 39.65% | 14,484 | 59.31% | 253 | 1.04% |
| 2017 | 8,382 | 39.38% | 12,453 | 58.50% | 451 | 2.12% |
| 2013 | 12,502 | 58.65% | 8,373 | 39.28% | 443 | 2.08% |
| 2009 | 11,230 | 47.29% | 10,727 | 45.17% | 1,792 | 7.55% |
| 2005 | 10,166 | 39.40% | 14,636 | 56.72% | 1,002 | 3.88% |

In the 2013 gubernatorial election, Republican Chris Christie received 58.6% of the vote (12,502 cast), ahead of Democrat Barbara Buono with 39.3% (8,373 votes), and other candidates with 2.1% (443 votes), among the 21,877 ballots cast by the township's 55,392 registered voters (559 ballots were spoiled), for a turnout of 39.5%. In the 2009 gubernatorial election, Republican Chris Christie received 46.6% of the vote (11,230 ballots cast), ahead of Democrat Jon Corzine with 44.5% (10,727 votes), Independent Chris Daggett with 6.4% (1,549 votes) and other candidates with 1.0% (243 votes), among the 24,097 ballots cast by the township's 53,358 registered voters, yielding a 45.2% turnout.

United States Senate election results for Edison1
| Year | Republican | | Democratic | | Third party(ies) | |
| Year | No. | % | No. | % | No. | % |
|---|---|---|---|---|---|---|
| 2024 | 14,634 | 38.68% | 21,531 | 56.91% | 1,667 | 4.41% |
| 2018 | 7,886 | 41.83% | 10,055 | 53.34% | 910 | 4.83% |
| 2012 | 11,357 | 34.41% | 20,987 | 63.59% | 662 | 2.01% |
| 2006 | 8,092 | 39.64% | 11,776 | 57.69% | 546 | 2.67% |

United States Senate election results for Edison2
| Year | Republican | | Democratic | | Third party(ies) | |
| Year | No. | % | No. | % | No. | % |
|---|---|---|---|---|---|---|
| 2020 | 14,862 | 35.67% | 25,816 | 61.96% | 985 | 2.36% |
| 2014 | 5,403 | 38.10% | 8,579 | 60.50% | 198 | 1.40% |
| 2013 | 5,039 | 42.53% | 6,708 | 56.62% | 100 | 0.84% |
| 2008 | 13,344 | 38.27% | 20,767 | 59.56% | 755 | 2.17% |

== Education ==
Edison Academy Magnet School

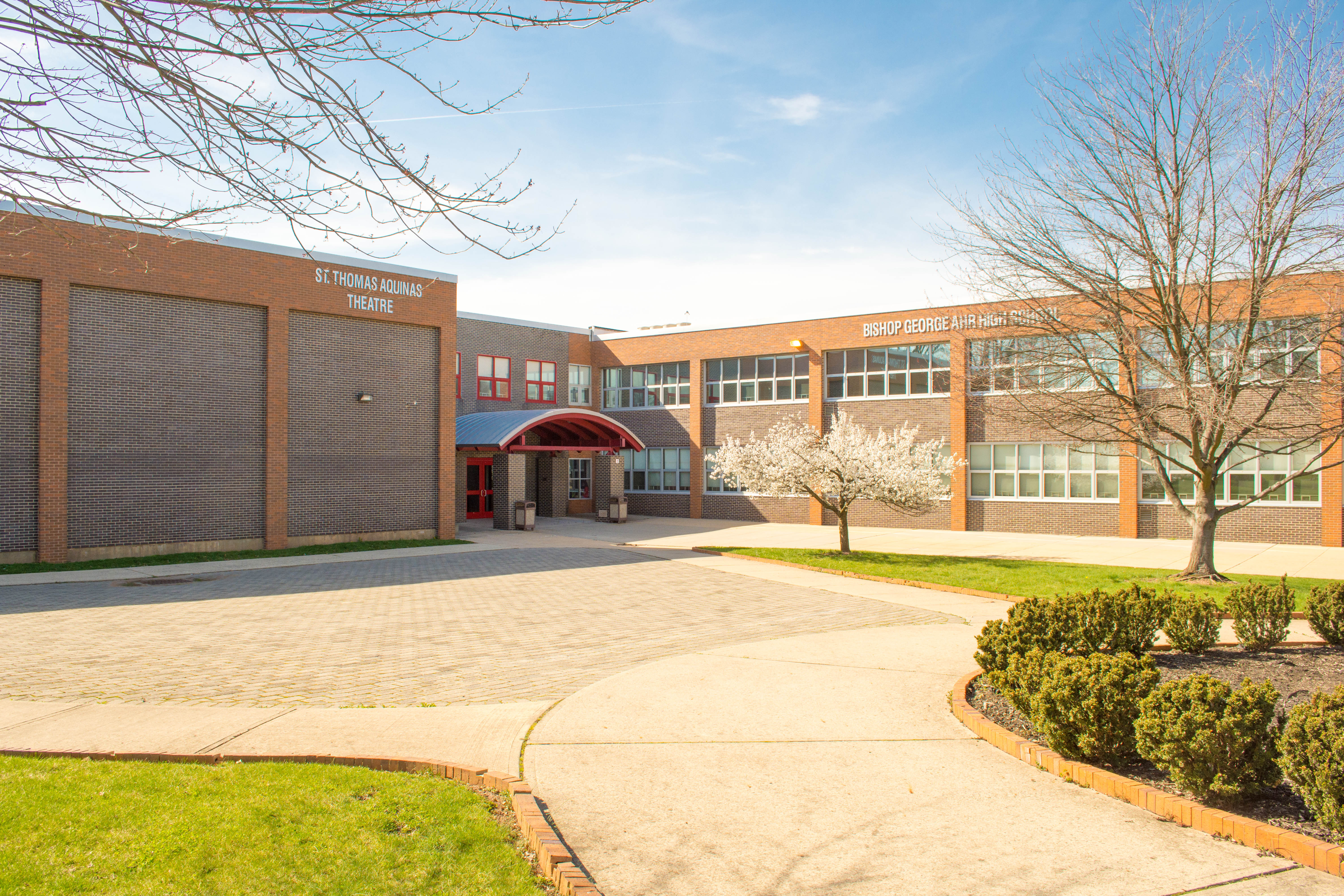
St. Thomas Aquinas High School

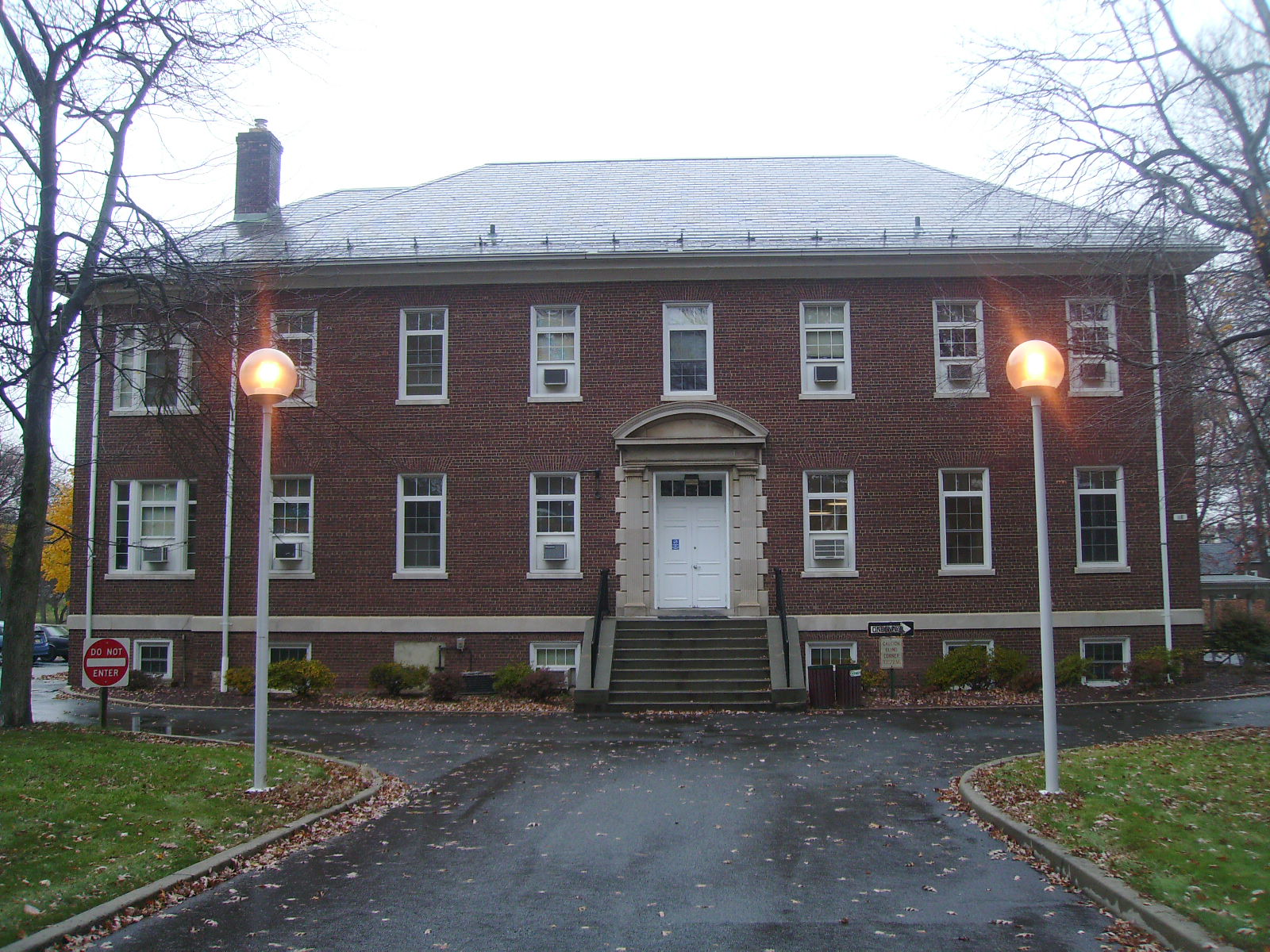
Middlesex County College

=== Public schools ===
The Edison Township Public Schools serve students in pre-kindergarten through twelfth grade. The district's two high schools separate the south and north ends of Edison. In the Edison High School zone to the south, there are six K–5 elementary schools and two 6-8 middle schools, while in the J.P. Stevens High School zone to the north, there are five K–5 elementary schools and two 6-8 middle schools. As of the 2021–22 school year, the district, comprised of 19 schools, had an enrollment of 16,268 students and 1,215.0 classroom teachers (on an FTE basis), for a student–teacher ratio of 13.4:1. Schools in the district (with 2021-22 enrollment data from the National Center for Education Statistics) are Edison Early Learning Center (53 students; grades PreK-K), Franklin D. Roosevelt Preschool (124; PreK-K), Benjamin Franklin Elementary School (602; K-5), Martin Luther King Jr. Elementary School (618; K-5), Lincoln Elementary School (900; K-5), Lindeneau Elementary School (444; K-5), James Madison Primary School (455; K-2, who then move on to James Madison Intermediate) James Madison Intermediate School (521; 3–5), John Marshall Elementary School (736; K-5), Menlo Park Elementary School (796; K-5), James Monroe Elementary School (521; K-5), Washington Elementary School (589; K-5), Woodbrook Elementary School (902; K-5), John Adams Middle School (980; 6–8, from James Madison Intermediate and MLK Jr.), Herbert Hoover Middle School (911; 6–8, from Franklin, Lincoln, Monroe, and some Lindeneau), Thomas Jefferson Middle School (868; 6–8, from Lindeneau, Marshall and Washington), Woodrow Wilson Middle School (1,163; from Menlo Park and Woodbrook), Edison High School (2,243; 9–12, from Hoover and Jefferson) and J.P. Stevens High School (2,643; 9–12, from Adams and Wilson).

J.P. Stevens was the 80th-ranked public high school in New Jersey out of 328 schools statewide in New Jersey Monthly magazine's September 2012 cover story on the state's "Top Public High Schools", after being ranked 65th in 2010 out of 322 schools listed, while Edison High School was ranked 174 in 2012 and 169 in 2010. According to U.S. News & World Report in 2016, J.P. Stevens ranked 41st within New Jersey and 905th nationally, while Edison H.S. ranked 59th and 2,015th.

The community is also served by the Greater Brunswick Charter School, a K–8 charter school serving students from Edison, Highland Park, Milltown, and New Brunswick. As of the 2021–22 school year, the school had an enrollment of 399 students and 32.5 classroom teachers (on an FTE basis), for a student–teacher ratio of 12.3:1.

Eighth grade students from all of Middlesex County are eligible to apply to attend the high school programs offered by the Middlesex County Magnet Schools, a county-wide vocational school district that offers full-time career and technical education at its schools in East Brunswick, Edison, Perth Amboy, Piscataway and Woodbridge Township, with no tuition charged to students for attendance. Middlesex College is home to Edison Academy Magnet School.

=== Private schools ===
St. Thomas Aquinas High School (9–12), St. Helena School (Pre-K–8), and St. Matthew School (Pre-K–8) operate under the supervision of Roman Catholic Diocese of Metuchen. Jewish schools in the township, which all operate independently, include Rabbi Jacob Joseph School, Rabbi Pesach Raymon Yeshiva (Pre-K–8, founded in 1945) and Yeshiva Shaarei Tzion (Pre-K–8, opened in 1992).

Other private schools in Edison include Lakeview School (for children ages 3–21 with disabilities), Our Lady of Peace School and Wardlaw-Hartridge School (Pre-K–12, founded in 1882).

In 1998, the Huaxia Edison Chinese School, which teaches in Simplified Chinese on Sunday afternoons, was established at Thomas Jefferson Middle School and subsequently relocated to Herbert Hoover Middle School. Huaxia currently resides in Edison High School. However, many families from Taiwan send their children to Edison Chinese School at John Adams Middle School or to Tzu Chi at Woodrow Wilson Middle School. These schools both teach Traditional Chinese. J.P. Stevens High School offers Mandarin Chinese and Standard Hindi as elective languages for students interested in learning them.

=== Colleges ===
Lincoln Tech is a for-profit vocational school located in Edison. Lincoln Tech offers various programs in Nursing and in medical and computer applications.

Middlesex College is a public, two-year community college located in Edison at the intersection of Woodbridge Avenue and Mill Road.

Rutgers University's Livingston campus is located on the former Camp Kilmer, partially located in Edison.

=== Libraries ===
Edison has three public library branches: The Main Branch, North Edison Branch, and the Clara Barton Branch.

== Infrastructure ==
=== Transportation ===
==== Roads and highways ====
Edison is a transport hub, with an extensive network of highways passing through the township and connecting to major Northeast cities, New York City, Boston, Philadelphia, Trenton and Washington, D.C. Edison is located about 25 miles (40 km) from Newark Liberty International Airport, a 30 to 45 minute drive.

As of May 2010, the township had a total of 307.05 miles (494.15 km) of roadways, of which 257.31 miles (414.10 km) were maintained by the municipality, 29.78 miles (47.93 km) by Middlesex County and 14.75 miles (23.74 km) by the New Jersey Department of Transportation and 5.21 miles (8.38 km) by the New Jersey Turnpike Authority.

State highways include Route 27 and Route 440, both of which are state-maintained. U.S. Route 1 also passes through the township. Interstate 287 passes through Edison, where it houses its southern end at Interstate 95. The municipality also houses about a 5-mile (8.0 km) section of the New Jersey Turnpike (Interstate 95). Exit 10 is located in Edison, featuring a 13-lane toll gate and a unique interchange design. When the "dual-dual" setup of the turnpike was created, it first started in Edison and continued north to exit 14 in Newark. It wasn't until 1971 that the project began to extend the "dual-dual" south of exit 10 to exit 9 in East Brunswick (and then extended further south in 1990 to exit 8A in Monroe Township).

Since Interstate 287 connects to Interstate 87 (the New York State Thruway), exit 10 (of the turnpike) is one of the busiest interchanges to be used by tractor-trailers as it connects the New Jersey Turnpike to the New York State Thruway. For truck drivers, it is the only direct limited-access road connection they have from the Turnpike to the Thruway, as the Garden State Parkway, which has its northern terminus at the Thruway, prohibits trucks from using the roadway north of Exit 105.

In 2009, the New Jersey Department of Transportation selected Edison as one of the first communities to have a red light camera enforcement system. The program was ended by the state in December 2014, despite a more than 30% drop in accidents at the three camera-controlled intersections in the township.

==== Public transportation ====
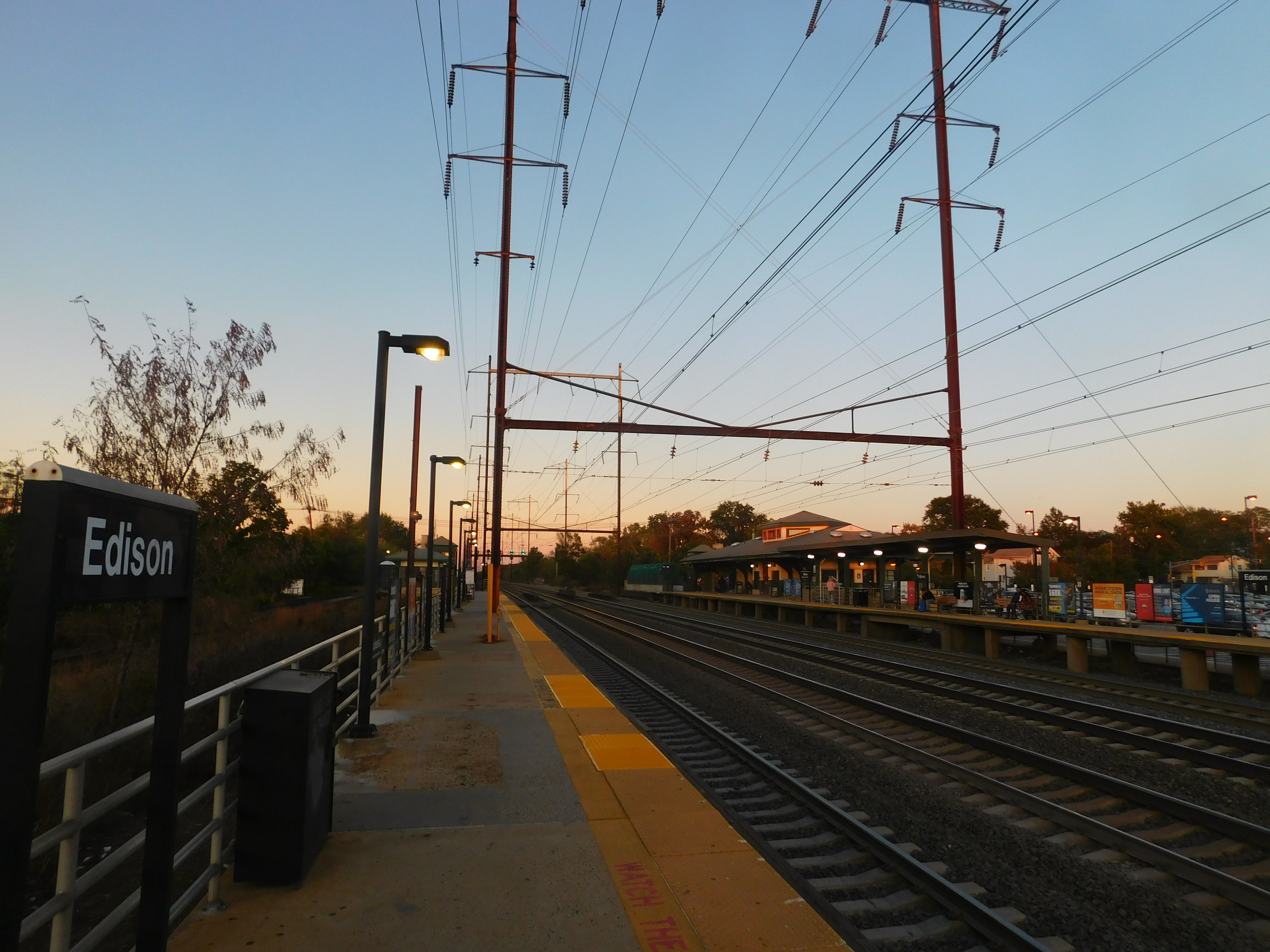
Edison station

Edison station, located in South Edison, is served by NJ Transit northbound trains to Newark Penn Station and New York Penn Station, and southbound to the Trenton Transit Center via the Northeast Corridor Line, with connecting service to Amtrak, and SEPTA. Some passengers in North Edison are closer to the Metropark station (near neighboring Iselin in Woodbridge Township) or Metuchen station.

NJ Transit bus service is provided on the 48 route to Elizabeth, with local service available on the 801, 804, 805, 810, 813, 814, and 819 routes.

The Taiwanese airline China Airlines provides private bus service to John F. Kennedy International Airport from the Kam Man Food location in Edison to feed its flight to Taipei, Taiwan.

=== Healthcare ===
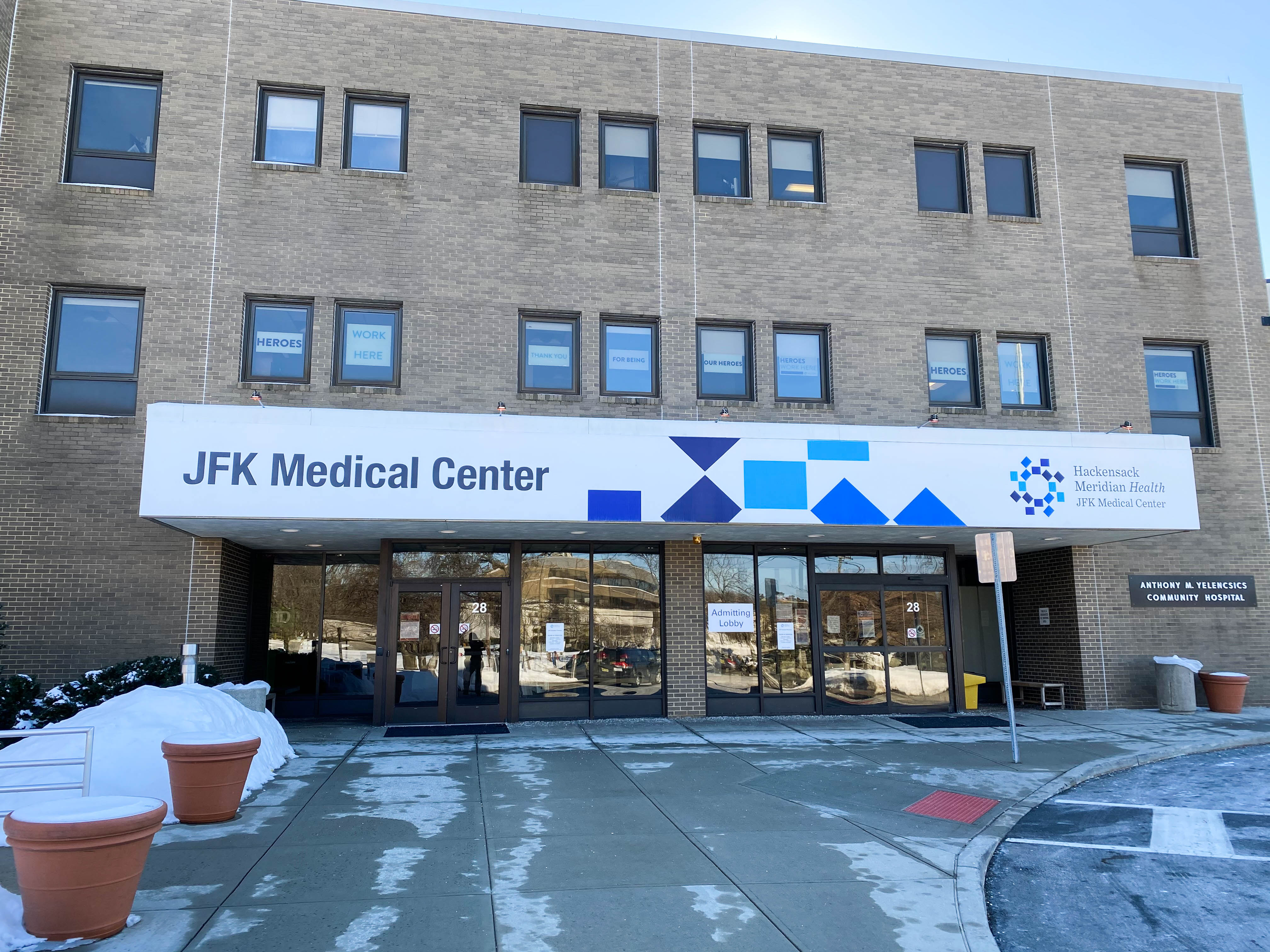
JFK Medical Center

JFK Medical Center, located on James Street off Parsonage Road, is a 498-bed hospital founded in 1967.

Roosevelt Care Center is a long-term/sub-acute care facility located just east of Roosevelt Park. The facility was originally constructed in 1936 under the auspices of the Work Projects Administration.

The Raritan Valley Regional EMS serves Edison. The squad consists of three sub-squads: Edison First Aid Squad #1 (established in 1935), Edison First Aid Squad #2 (since 1936), and Clara Barton First Aid Squad (since 1951). The three squads merged in 2009 to provide Edison residents with more comprehensive care. RVREMS receives support from paramedics out of JFK Medical Center. The squad consists of approximately 50 volunteer EMTs.

=== Telecommunications ===
Edison is served by area codes 732 and 848 and 908. Area Code 848 is an overlay area code created to avoid a split.

Edison has five Verizon Central offices serving the Township:

- Central Office Rahway (Switch ID: RHWYNJRADS5) (Area Code 732): Serving from Wood Avenue North to Roxy Avenue on the west side of the Street inward to New Dover Road.
- Central Office Plainfield (Switch ID: PLFDNJPFDS5) (Area Code 908): Serving Roxy Avenue heading north into South Plainfield on both sides of Inman Avenue.
- Central Office Metuchen (Switch ID: MTCHNJMTDS5) (Area Code 732): Serving Edison, Metuchen, and Iselin (Technically, Iselin Numbers that have 732–283 and 732–404 are routed out of the Woodbridge Office Switch ID: WDBRNJWDDS5).
- Central Office Edison (Switch ID: EDSNNJEDDS5): Serving South Edison with phone numbers that come up as "New Brunswick" – 732–339, 732–393, 732–572, 732–777, 732–819, 732–985, and Exchanges for "Metuchen" that are 732–248, 732–287, 732–650.
- Central Office Fords (Switch ID: FRDSNJFRDS5): Serving the Eastern Edison area and the Raritan Center area with 732–225, 732–346, 732–417, 732–512, and Perth Amboy Exchanges 732–661, 732–738.

In 1982, the BPU and New Jersey Bell, after receiving thousands of complaints from both North and South Edison residents, made an exception: any calls originating and terminating in the Township would be considered local calls. This was due to new home construction in Edison, where existing cables from the Rahway central office were rerouted to provide new phone service to over 400 homes.

In 1997, mandatory ten-digit dialing was introduced in Edison with the introduction of Area code 732. Edison residents living on Roxy Avenue were once again in the news, with one side of the street served by the Rahway central office (Area Code 732) and the other side by the Plainfield central office (Area Code 908). Residents complained to the BPU and Bell Atlantic that it would be easier to yell across the street than dial a ten-digit number to call their neighbor across the street.

Edison has Cablevision's Optimum cable television service. Before Cablevision, there was TKR, which was so poorly run that numerous FCC and BPU complaints about programming, along with many town hall meetings, eventually forced change. Cablevision bought out TKR.

== Sister cities ==
- Shijiazhuang, Hebei, China
- Vadodara, Gujarat, India

== Notable people ==
People who were born in, residents of, or otherwise closely associated with Edison include:

- Peter J. Barnes Jr. (1928–2018), Chairman of the New Jersey State Parole Board who had served in the New Jersey General Assembly
- Peter J. Barnes III (born 1956), politician who serves in the New Jersey General Assembly and previously on the Edison Township Council
- Tyus Battle (born 1997), college basketball player for the Syracuse Orange
- Brandon Bielak (born 1996), pitcher for the Houston Astros of Major League Baseball
- Gayleatha B. Brown (1947–2013), United States Ambassador to Benin and to Burkina Faso
- David Bryan (born 1962), keyboardist, founding member of Bon Jovi
- Michael Campbell (born 1989), wide receiver who played in the NFL for the New York Jets
- Leonte Carroo (born 1994), wide receiver who has played in the NFL for the Miami Dolphins
- Jun Choi (born 1971), politician who served as Mayor of Edison
- Rich Clementi (born 1976), mixed martial arts fighter
- Ken Cuccinelli (born 1968), former Attorney General of Virginia
- Jerry Dior (1932–2015), graphic designer, best known for creating the Major League Baseball logo
- Tom Dwan (born 1986), professional poker player
- Bernard J. Dwyer (1921–1998), politician who served in the United States House of Representatives from 1981 to 1993
- Thomas Edison (1847–1931), inventor, businessman, and entrepreneur who is the township's namesake
- Katherine Polk Failla (born 1969), United States district judge of the United States District Court for the Southern District of New York
- Darren Fenster (born 1978), former professional baseball player who has been a manager in the Boston Red Sox Minor League Baseball system
- Gail Fisher (1935–2000), actress best known for her role on Mannix
- Denis Frisoli (1959–2009), unicyclist who set a world record for riding a unicycle at a height of 35 feet 5 inches (10.80 m)
- Rich Gaspari (born 1963), retired professional bodybuilder and founder of supplement company Gaspari Nutrition who was inducted into the IFBB Hall of Fame in 2004
- Greg Gigantino (born c. 1955), college football coach who was the head football coach for Iona College in 1984
- Frank Guinta (born 1970), served in the U.S. House of Representatives from New Hampshire's 1st congressional district
- Halsey (born 1994 as Ashley Nicolette Frangipane) singer-songwriter
- John Jay Hoffman (born 1965), lawyer who served as the acting attorney general of New Jersey from 2013 to 2016
- Alexander Julien (born 1988), musician, member of Vision Eternel, lived in the Briarwood East community
- Clarence Lewis, American football defensive back for the Tennessee Titans of the
- Pamela Long, singer with former Bad Boy group Total
- Paul Matey (born 1971), attorney who is a United States circuit judge of the United States Court of Appeals for the Third Circuit
- Patrick McDonnell (born 1956), cartoonist, creator Mutts comics
- Earl Schenck Miers (1910–1972), historian who wrote extensively about the American Civil War
- Victor Mitchell (born 1965), former member of the Colorado House of Representatives
- Akash Modi (born 1995), artistic gymnast who represented the United States at the 2018 World Artistic Gymnastics Championships
- Brittany Murphy (1977–2009), actress
- Jim Norton (born 1968), stand-up comedian
- Margie Palatini, author of books for children
- Robert Pastorelli (1954–2004), theater, film and television actor
- Zach Perez (born 1996), professional soccer player who plays as a defender for USL League One club Richmond Kickers
- Marc Pisciotta (born 1970), former Major League Baseball pitcher
- Mark L. Polansky (born 1956), NASA astronaut
- Bernard Purdie (born 1942), prolific session drummer
- Retta (born 1970), comedian and actress, best known for her roles of Donna Meagle on NBC's Parks and Recreation and Ruby Hill on NBC's Good Girls
- Jim Rose (born 1953), sports anchor for WLS-TV in Chicago, Illinois
- Matt Salzberg, businessperson and entrepreneur who co-founded Blue Apron (where he was CEO), Embark Veterinary and Suma Brands
- Susan Sarandon (born 1946), actress, lived in the Stephenville community
- Jasmin Singer (born 1979), animal rights activist, writer, speaker and actress
- Janet Smith, former long-distance runner who competed in the 5000-meter run, 10000-meter run and cross country
- Chris Snee (born 1982), guard who has played for the New York Giants
- George A. Spadoro (born 1955), former mayor of Edison, Council President and Assemblyman
- Joel Stein (born 1971), Los Angeles Times columnist
- Robert T. Stevens (1899–1983), businessman and former chairman of J.P. Stevens and Company
- Anthony Stolarz (born 1994), professional ice hockey goaltender for the Toronto Maple Leafs of the National Hockey League and 2024 Stanley Cup Champion
- Jim Stoops (born 1972), former professional baseball pitcher who played for one season in MLB for the Colorado Rockies
- Jennifer Sung (born 1972), lawyer who is a nominee to be a United States circuit judge of the United States Court of Appeals for the Ninth Circuit
- Marques Townes (born 1995), basketball player for the Loyola Ramblers men's basketball team, who transferred out of Cardinal McCarrick after his sophomore year
- Karl-Anthony Towns (born 1995), professional basketball player for the New York Knicks
- Mike Vallely (born 1970), professional skateboarder and lead singer of Black Flag
- Gary Vaynerchuk (born 1975), entrepreneur and Internet personality who spent much of his childhood in Edison
- Jeffrey A. Warsh (born 1960), politician who served two terms in the New Jersey General Assembly, from 1992 to 1996, where he represented the 18th Legislative District
- Darrin Winston (1966–2008), played two seasons in Major League Baseball for the Philadelphia Phillies
- Jeremy Zuttah (born 1986), offensive lineman for the Tampa Bay Buccaneers

== Notable places ==
- Advian, which in 2012 featured what was then the nation's largest solar rooftop installation at 17 acres (6.9 ha).
- Bonhamtown, site of a battle during the American Revolutionary War
- Camp Kilmer, a World War II era army post, was partially located in what is now Edison.
- Dismal Swamp, preserved wetlands area that also includes portions of Metuchen and South Plainfield.
- Durham Woods, a complex of several apartment buildings and scene of the Edison, New Jersey natural gas explosion in 1994, in which a 36-inch natural gas pipeline burst and exploded, destroying buildings in the area.
- Edison Landfill, landfill site undergoing environmental cleanup since it was ordered closed in 1977.
- Edison station in South Edison, offering service on NJ Transit's Northeast Corridor Line.
- ILR Landfill, a closed landfill site owned by Industrial Land Reclaiming (ILR), provides power to Middlesex County's wastewater treatment operations from methane gas recovery.
- Kin-Buc Landfill, former landfill and Superfund site where 70 million US gallons (260,000 m^{3}) of hazardous waste was dumped.
- Laing House of Plainfield Plantation, historic home built in the early 1700s when Scottish Quakers were settling the region in the late 17th and early 18th century.
- Roosevelt Park, a 196-acre park next to Menlo Park Mall.
- Menlo Park Mall, located at the intersection of Route 1 and Parsonage Road, has a gross leasable area of 1,260,703 square feet (117,123.1 m^{2}).
- Oak Tree Road in Edison and the Iselin section of Woodbridge Township is known for its large concentration of Indian stores and restaurants.
- The Thomas Alva Edison Memorial Tower and Museum, in Menlo Park, dedicated in 1938. Located in Edison State Park, at the site where its namesake inventor invented the incandescent light bulb and the phonograph.
- Tastee Sub Shop is a popular sandwich establishment off of Route 27 Lincoln Highway in South Edison that President Barack Obama visited in 2010 as part of a small business campaign.

== See also ==
- Edison divorce torture plot
