= Clara Barton, New Jersey =

Populated place in Middlesex County, New Jersey, US

- Unincorporated community
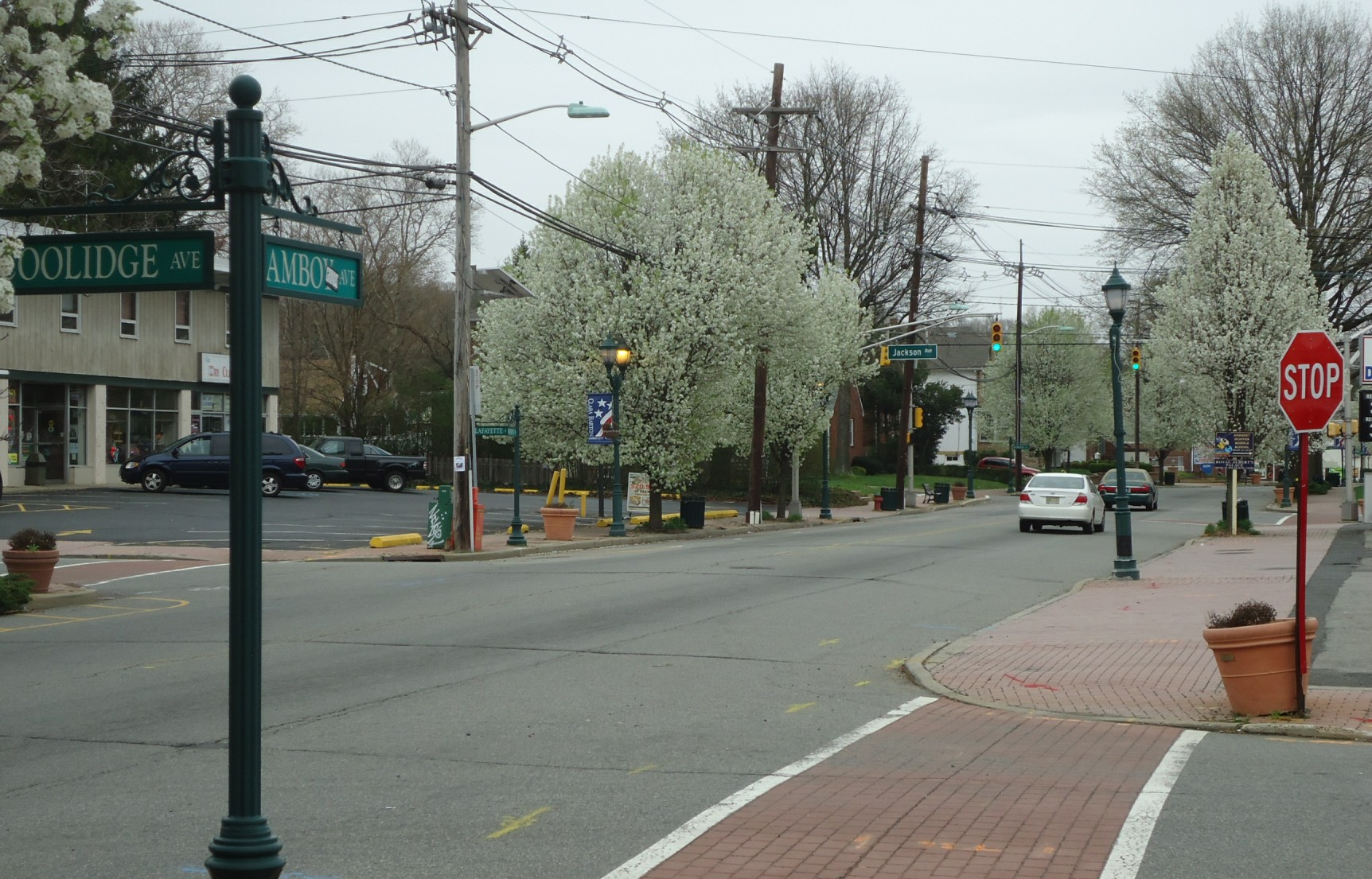
- CR 501 (Amboy Avenue) in the Clara Barton neighborhood

- Location within Middlesex County, New Jersey Location within New Jersey Location within the United States
- Coordinates: 40°32′03″N 74°20′22″W
- Country: United States
- State: New Jersey
- County: Middlesex
- Township: Edison
- Elevation: 98 ft (30 m)
- GNIS feature ID: 883374

Clara Barton is an unincorporated community located within Edison Township in Middlesex County, in the U.S. state of New Jersey. It takes its name from Clara Barton.

Located in the eastern part of the sprawling township, Clara Barton is more urban in its density and has a small central business district on Amboy Avenue. The "village-like" section of it is separated from the township's bustling highways and stretches of retail and is home to one of the township's three public libraries. The Middlesex Greenway runs along the neighborhood's southern boundary.

== See also ==
- List of neighborhoods in Edison, New Jersey
