= Benjamin Shotwell House =

Historic house in New Jersey, United States

- Benjamin Shotwell House; Shotwell-Runyon House
- U.S. National Register of Historic Places
- New Jersey Register of Historic Places
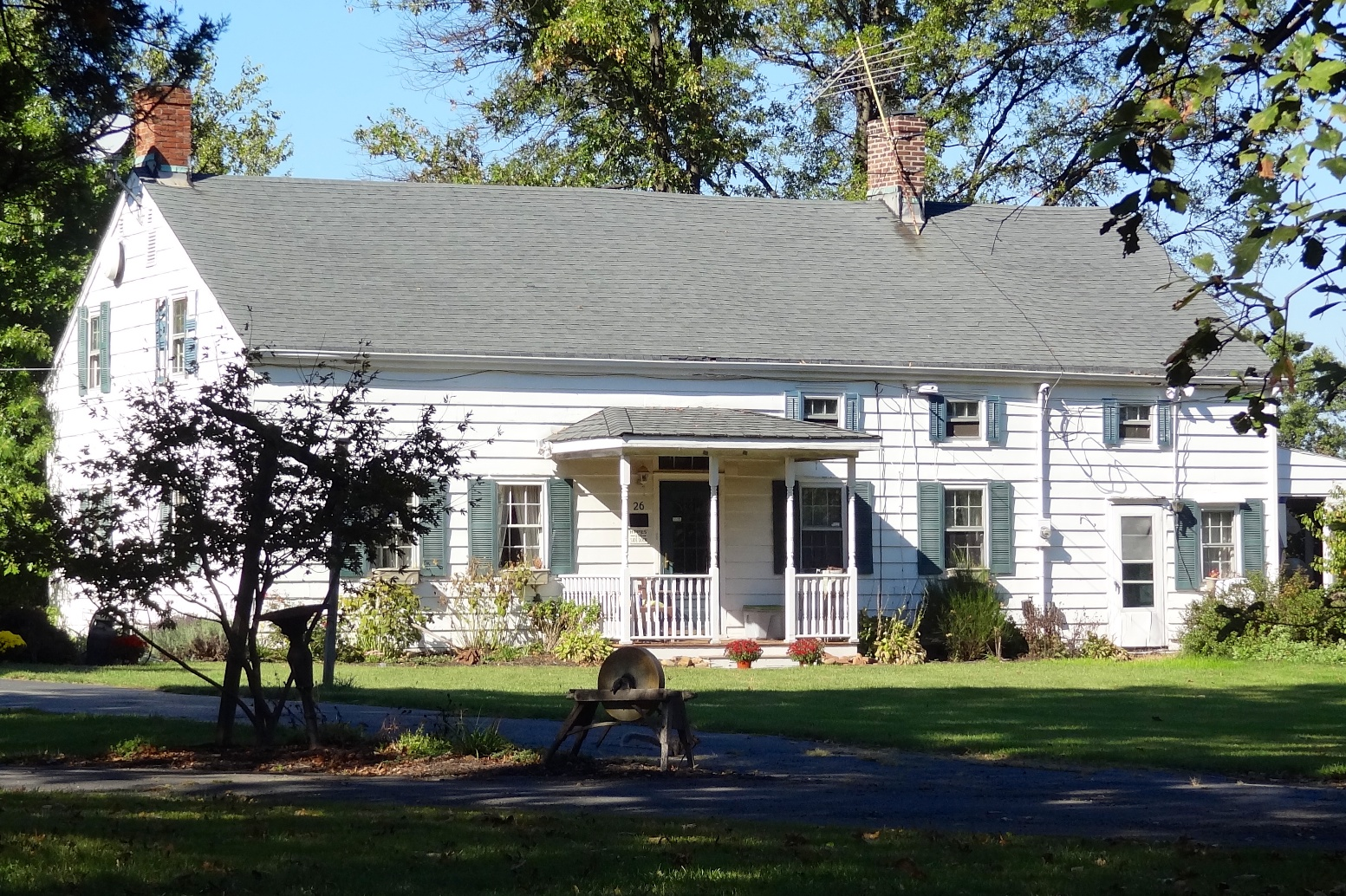

- Location within Middlesex County, New Jersey Location within New Jersey Location within the United States
- Location: 26 Runyon's Lane; Edison, New Jersey
- Coordinates: 40°32′51.5″N 74°24′15.5″W
- Built: ca. 1750-1775
- NRHP reference No.: 87000875
- NJRHP No.: 1840

Significant dates
- Added to NRHP: June 4, 1987
- Designated NJRHP: April 28, 1987

The Benjamin Shotwell House, also known as the Shotwell–Runyon House, is a historic house located at 26 Runyon's Lane in the township of Edison in Middlesex County, New Jersey, United States. It was documented by the Historic American Buildings Survey (HABS) in 1938, noted as being near Metuchen. The house was added to the National Register of Historic Places on June 4, 1987, for its significance in architecture and exploration/settlement. The farm on which is located in part of Route 287. The Shotwells were early settlers of "The Plains", an early reference to Plainfield, New Jersey.

== History ==
Benjamin Shotwell bought 27.5 acres (11.1 ha) from Jonathan Dunham and Joseph FitzRandolph in 1775. At the time, this area was part of the township of Piscataway. The property was inherited by his daughter, Nancy Shotwell, who had married Lewis Thornall. They sold it in 1801 to John Runyon, a farmer and carpenter. It was owned until 1946 by his descendants: Ephraim Runyon, Isaac S. Runyon, Herbert Runyon, and Gilbert Runyon.

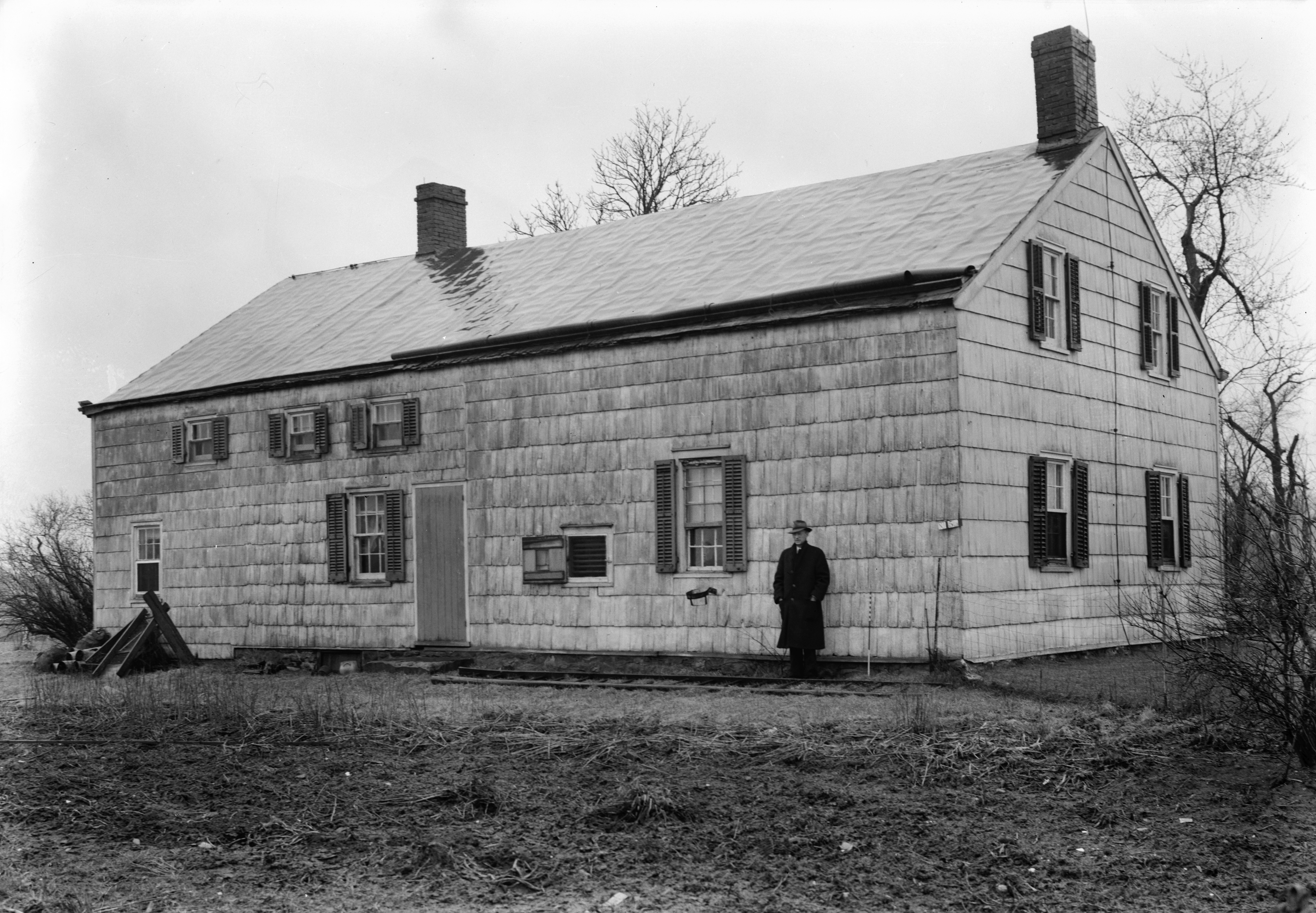
HABS photo from 1938

== See also ==
- National Register of Historic Places listings in Middlesex County, New Jersey
- Homestead Farm at Oak Ridge
- List of the oldest buildings in New Jersey
