= Rabbi Pesach Raymon Yeshiva =

Private school in Middlesex County, New Jersey, United States

Location
- 2 Harrison Street; Edison, Middlesex County, New Jersey 08817; United States; 40.507604°N 74.429195°W

Information
- Type: Private
- Religious affiliation: Orthodox Judaism
- Established: 1945
- Founder: Rabbi Pesach Raymon
- NCES School ID: 00869386
- Principal: Chana Luchins
- Head of school: Rabbi Michael Ribalt
- Faculty: 24.1 FTEs
- Grades: PreN-8
- Enrollment: 229 (plus 53 in PreK, as of 2017–18)
- Student to teacher ratio: 9.5:1
- Nickname: RPRY
- Accreditation: Middle States Association of Colleges and Schools
- Website: www.rpry.org

Rabbi Pesach Raymon Yeshiva is a co-educational Orthodox Jewish day school in Edison, in Middlesex County, New Jersey, United States, that serves students in two year olds and pre-Nursery through eighth grade. Rabbi Pesach Raymon Yeshiva has been accredited by the Middle States Association of Colleges and Schools Commission on Secondary Schools since 2001.

As of the 2017–18 school year, the school had an enrollment of 229 students (plus 53 in PreK) and 24.1 classroom teachers (on an FTE basis), for a student–teacher ratio of 9.5:1. The school's student body was 99.1% (227) White and 0.9% (2) Hispanic.

== Awards and recognition ==
In September 2013, the yeshiva was one of 15 schools in New Jersey to be recognized by the United States Department of Education as part of the National Blue Ribbon Schools Program, an award called the "most prestigious honor in the United States' education system" and which Education Secretary Arne Duncan described as honoring schools that "represent examples of educational excellence".
