= Sino Monthly New Jersey =

Sino Monthly New Jersey (Chinese: 漢新月刊) is a Chinese American monthly magazine published in New Jersey, United States. Founded by Ivy Lee in 1991, its editorial office is in Edison, New Jersey. The magazine is editorially independent and, because it focuses primarily on issues local to the Overseas Chinese of Central Jersey, it has become a newspaper of record for the community. The magazine is published in Traditional Chinese. In 2011, on the occasion of its 20th anniversary, Sino Monthly was presented with an Outstanding Community Media Award from the New Jersey chapter of the Organization of Chinese Americans.

In May 2023, the U.S. National Public Radio (NPR) featured Sino Monthly in an interview titled 'Like milk': How one magazine became a mainstay of New Jersey's Chinese community.

In 2024, after 33 years of publication, Sino Monthly ceased publication. Its final issue was the Jun 2024 edition, No. 394.
