= Roosevelt Hospital (Edison, New Jersey) =

- U.S. National Register of Historic Places
- New Jersey Register of Historic Places
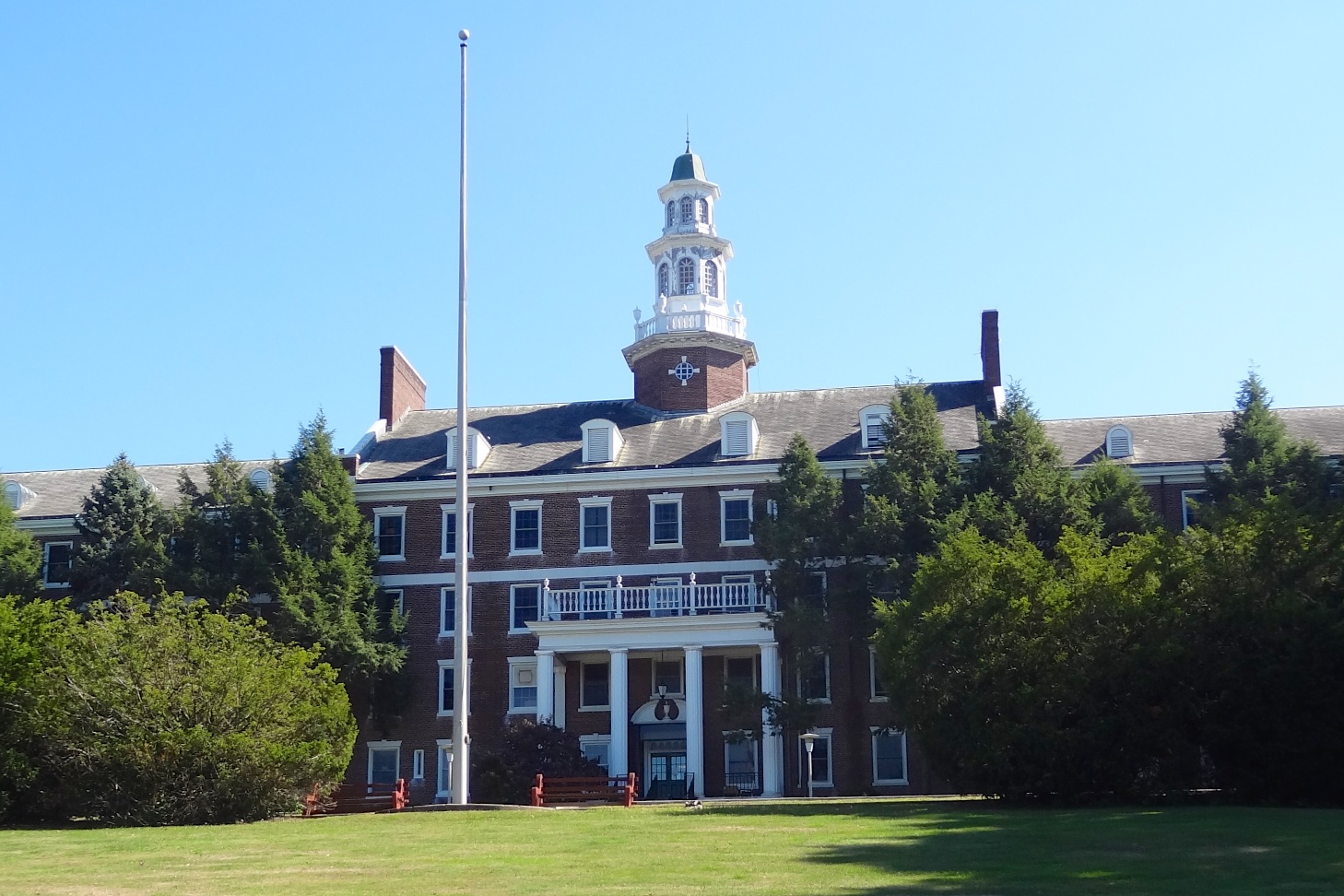

- Location within Middlesex County, New Jersey Location within New Jersey Location within the United States
- Location: 1 Roosevelt Drive, Edison, New Jersey
- Coordinates: 40°33′04″N 74°20′16″W
- Area: 9.7 acres (3.9 ha)
- Built: 1937
- Architect: Aylin Pierson
- Architectural style: Colonial Revival
- NRHP reference No.: 02000109
- NJRHP No.: 3854

Significant dates
- Added to NRHP: March 5, 2002
- Designated NJRHP: January 9, 2001

Roosevelt Hospital is a historic building located at 1 Roosevelt Drive in the township of Edison in Middlesex County, New Jersey. It was added to the National Register of Historic Places on March 5, 2002, for its significance in health and medicine, in particular the treatment of tuberculosis. It is currently an affordable senior (62+) housing development. It consists of 84 one- and two-bedroom units, ranging from 659 square fee to 1,034 square feet. Units are affordable at a variety of income tiers and ADA units are available to those with mobility challenges.

== History and description ==
Construction of the hospital was started in 1935 and completed in 1937. The red brick building was designed by architect Aylin Pierson with Colonial Revival style and features an octagonal tower on the roof and white terra cotta details in the interior. It was viewed as "an outstanding example of compact, well organized planning" in Architectural Forum.

Roosevelt Park, located next to the hospital, was built as part of the treatment facilities for tuberculosis.

== Gallery ==
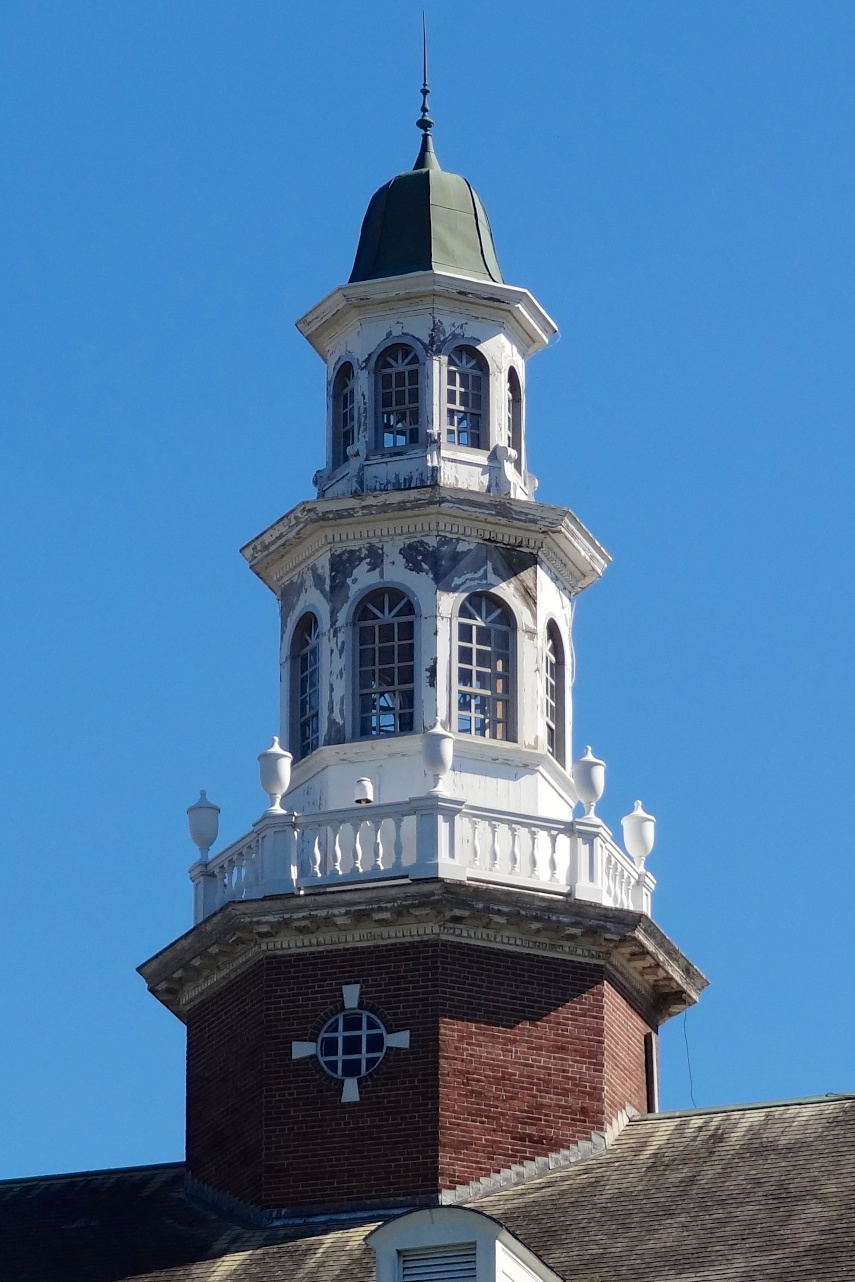
Tower architecture details

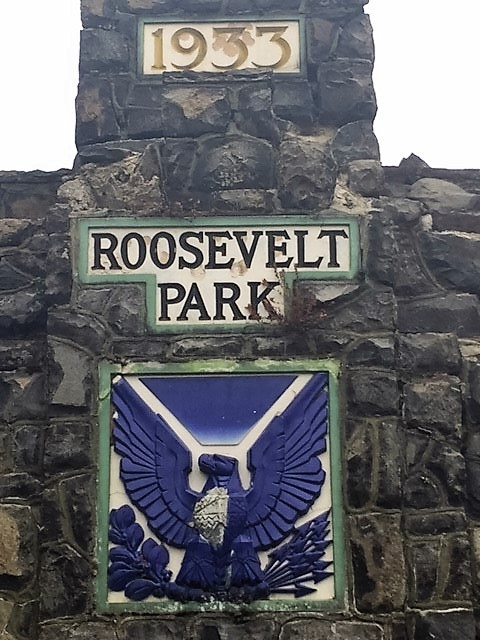
Roosevelt Park plaque
