= Stephenville, New Jersey =

Populated place in Middlesex County, New Jersey, US

- Unincorporated community
- Location of Stephenville in Middlesex County Inset: Location of county within the state of New Jersey Stephenville, New Jersey (New Jersey) Stephenville, New Jersey (the United States)
- Coordinates: 40°33′57″N 74°22′42″W
- Country: United States
- State: New Jersey
- County: Middlesex
- Township: Edison
- Established: October 1949
- Elevation: 141 ft (43 m)
- ZIP Code: 08820
- Area codes: 732 and 908

Stephenville (also called Stephenville Ranch, Stephenville Ranch Homes or Stephenville Village) is an unincorporated community and residential neighborhood located within Edison Township in Middlesex County, in the U.S. state of New Jersey. The community is centered around Park Avenue, which borders the south and west ends of the community, Stephenville Parkway, a median strip-street which runs east–west in the center of the community, and Plainfield Road, which borders the east end of the community. An eastern addition to Stephenville was planned in the early 1950s, east of Plainfield Road, but after years of political, residential and township issues, it was ultimately abandoned and portions were sectioned off into different communities during the late 1950s and early 1960s. Stephenville is located between Sutton Hollow to the north, the Oak Tree-Stephenville Park to the northeast, Hampshire Gardens, Carriage Hill and Arrowhead Park to the east, Woodbrook Corners to the south, and Park Gate and New Petrograd to the west.

Stephenville was developed and built by contractor Frank P. Tufaro through his building and development firm Terra-Nova Construction Company, with plans designed by architect Erwin Gerber. The community was named after Tufaro's eldest son, Stephen D. Tufaro. When first developed in the late 1940s, the rural community was unattached to nearby neighborhoods, but by the early 1950s, it was often linked as a sub-section of Oak Tree due to the school and fire districts. The community originally had its mail delivered by the Borough of Metuchen Post Office and its sewer system was connected to the Metuchen Sewer Treatment Plant. Bigger and newer township-wide schools were built, replacing neighborhood-based schools, and the postal service routes were re-organized as more land was developed between existing communities in the 1950s and 1960s, leading formerly distinct communities in Edison Township to blur their dividing lines.

Stephenville was largely responsible for getting Raritan Township to construct a modern sewer system in the northern part of the township. Local neighborhoods up to that point had septic systems installed to each house, but the land had poor seepage due to the proximity of Dismal Swamp and residents experienced frequent raw sewage overflow. The community took up their case with the Raritan Township Board of Commissioners, the Raritan Township Board of Health, the Federal Housing Administration, the New Jersey Department of Health and the Veterans Administration in the early 1950s and successfully pushed for the township to modernize sanitary living conditions.

== History ==
=== Early building and development (1948–1950) ===
Stephenville was announced in December 1948 as a post-war residential development community by Frank P. Tufaro, President of the development firm Terra-Nova Construction Company. Tufaro, an Italian-American contractor living in Hartsdale, New York, named the company after his place of birth, Terranova di Pollino in Italy. Tufaro applied for approval of building plans from the Raritan Township Planning Board and Zoning Commission on December 13, 1948. In early February 1949, Tufaro purchased 170 acres from Edward C. Dana and his wife Helen E. Dana, executors of Walter Williams' will. The tract of land purchased was at the time known as the "Williams tract" in an area loosely referred to as Oak Tree Park, and had much earlier been used as farming land. The property then only included two small cottages and a barn. A portion of the land had an easement from the Texas Eastern Transmission Corporation, where the Big Inch pipeline had been laid between 1942 and 1943 as a World War II emergency oil-carrying measure.

Tufaro asked the Raritan Township Planning Board and Zoning Commission to designate the land as a Residential Class B Zone, which would allow him to build 400 single-family homes on smaller lots. But on March 15, 1949, the Raritan Township Planning Board and Zoning Commission voted instead to designate the land as a 100% Residential Class A Zone; limiting the amount of dwellings developers could include in allocated lot sizes. This forced the Terra-Nova Construction Company to enlarge each home's plot of land and decrease the amount of dwellings in the tract to 300.

The designated area for the new community was defined as "a 186-acre tract of land between Park Avenue and Plainfield Road, opposite Arrowhead Park", and "between Metuchen and Plainfield, not far from Oak Hills Manor in North Raritan Township". More precisely, it was an area south of Oak Tree and below the Bound Brook stream, north of Pumptown Corners and Woodbrook Farms (a dairy farm), east of Dismal Swamp and New Petrograd, west of Arrowhead Park, and a relative distance west of Grove Avenue in Menlo Park. The land was an unincorporated portion of Raritan Township and the community would be built easterly off of the existing Park Avenue roadway, which connected the Borough of Metuchen, through Raritan Township's Pumptown Corners, Oak Hills, Oak Grove and Arrowhead Park communities with the Oak Tree community farther up north. Terra-Nova Construction Company made a deal with the Borough of Metuchen-based real estate broker and insurance firm Bohlen & Synden Agency, which had also handled Tufaro's purchase of the land, in which Walter Bohlen would be the exclusive real estate sales agent.

Stephenville's 300 dwellings were to be situated in a "parklike community" with 100-foot by 200-foot plots of land and modern ranch-style houses. Each five-room house was to include a complete kitchen with an electric range, Formica sink top, refrigerator, washing machine and exhaust fan, a bathroom with a tile bath and colored fixtures, a 22-foot living room, recessed radiators, a scuttle opening for full attic access, full insulation, hot water heating, a 550-gallon oil tank and a landscaped property-front. Because of its housing style, the community was sometimes advertised as Stephenville Ranch or Stephenville Ranch Homes, and was at times mistakenly written as Stephenville Village in newspapers. The community building plans were designed by Newark-based architect Erwin Gerber.

Stephenville and Stephenville Parkway were named after Tufaro's first son, Stephen D. Tufaro. He also named several of the community's streets after other members of his family: Maida Road after his wife's maiden name, Stephania A. Maida; Richard Road after his second son, Richard Chase Tufaro; David Court after his third son, David F. Tufaro; and Frances Road after his daughter, Frances Tufaro. May years later, David Tufaro went on to form a contracting company named in honor of his father, Terra Nova Ventures, based in Baltimore, Maryland. Williams Road was named in honor of Walter Williams, whose land Stephenville was built on, while Dana Circle was named after Edward C. Dana and his wife Helen E. Dana, who executed Williams will and sold the land.

47 building permits were issued for Stephenville's development in January 1950. By the end of February 1950, the community's first section, which included 35 houses still under construction along Park Avenue, had all been sold. The houses sold for approximately $10,500 a piece, with no down payment required for veterans, and families began moving in as soon as the houses were completed. By May 1950, 50 houses in Stephenville, consisting of the first two sections, had been sold and completed and the construction of an additional 40 was already underway.

By September 1950, residents had begun to move into houses on Hillwood Avenue and Dana Circle and the Terra-Nova Construction Company had 116 houses under construction. Borough of Metuchen real estate brokers Leichner-Timpson & Company took over the closing of sales in place of Bohlen & Synden Agency. In October 1950, another 60 homes were granted building permits. By November 1950, the newly built homes were advertised to include name brand appliances such as Crosley refrigerators, Bendix washing machines, oak floors and attached garages, for a cost ranging between $12,000 and $13,500. That same month, families began moving into Williams Road and Terra-Nova Construction Company announced that 110 houses had so-far been completed, with an additional 192 under construction.

On December 7, 1950, Alphonse Seyfried was appointed section air raid warden for Stephenville, as well as the neighboring communities Oak Hills, Arrowhead Park and Dismal Swamp. In mid-December 1950, Tufaro purchased 16 acres of land east of Plainfield Road and north of the Metuchen Golf and Country Club from Dr. Wilbert Westcott, Jr. Tufaro was already planning to expand Stephenville east-ward, above Arrowhead Park, until it met up with Menlo Park's western addition. 31 new ranch homes were initially scheduled to be built in the new addition, and the building permits were obtained on December 12, 1950. The price range of the new houses, which would sit on half of an acre each, ranged between $16,000 and $25,000 and catered to richer families that wanted to live near the private Metuchen Golf and Country Club.

=== Septic tank issues and sewer system improvement (1951–1953) ===
As early as January 1951, Stephenville residents and neighboring Plainfield Road-area residents began complaining about muddy streets due to high truck traffic and lack of proper sewer drainage. In March 1951, it was alleged that the development had inadequately followed building and plumbing codes, principally concerning septic systems and raw sewage drainage. Stephenville, like many rural developments of the era, was not connected to Raritan Township's limited master sewer system and each house was instead equipped with a septic tank. The community was however built in proximity of Dismal Swamp and therefore had a poor seepage factor. The influx of new residents and workers in the community quickly oversaturated the grounds which already struggled to drain properly into the swamp. This caused septic tanks to overflow its raw sewage onto lawns and streets, into the nearby Bound Brook (from then on renamed the Stephenville Brook) and streams and even back into houses.

The health hazard conditions led to an investigation from the Raritan Township Board of Commissioners, the Raritan Township Board of Health, the Federal Housing Administration and the New Jersey Department of Health and gathered interest from Senators Howard Alexander Smith and Robert C. Hendrickson. Stephenville residents requested that Tufaro's building permits be revoked in an effort to halt further development of the community until the problem could be corrected. The New Jersey Department of Health deployed an urgency plan to educate families and their children on keeping their premises clean during the crisis, and local schools were given films and programs to keep children away from play areas and streams contaminated by raw sewage flow. Tufaro stated that the area of the development was having its highest ground water level in 40 years, which he said was largely responsible for the trouble. Later investigations also revealed that water drains had once been built and then buried, at a time when the land was farmed, and that the amount of water carried into the area significantly reduced the seepage factor of the land.

After several weeks of investigation, the New Jersey Department of Health, the Raritan Township Board of Commissioners and Tufaro came to an understanding in which Terra-Nova Construction Company would spend a considerable amount of money to correct the situation and maintain every septic tank in the community for a year. Tufaro made a good-faith promise to the Raritan Township Board of Commissioners that no new families would move into Stephenville until tests showed that the septic tanks were properly functioning for each household. It was under this promise that the New Jersey Department of Health held in abeyance. The Raritan Township Board of Commissioners, however, pointed out that due to the water tables in that location, the only permanent solution would be for the residents to invest in the installation of a sanitary sewer system, for which Tufaro was not responsible. The Terra-Nova Construction Company solved much of the problem by digging out and removing the old farming draining system.

By mid-April 1951, Tufaro was again allowing new families to move into the community, thus breaking his verbal promise to the New Jersey Department of Health and the Raritan Township Board of Commissioners. The Raritan Township Board of Commissioners immediately ordered township attorney Thomas Hanson to take legal actions and restrain the Terra-Nova Construction Company from building any more homes in Stephenville, and to prevent any more occupancies be issued for existing houses, until the health hazards from the sewage were eliminated. The Raritan Township Board of Commissioners also ordered Tufaro to construct a sanitary sewer system in Stephenville, at his own cost, as a penalty for breaking faith. The New Jersey Department of Health concurred that a drainage and sewer system was the only plausible solution for providing the housing development with sanitary living conditions. The Terra-Nova Construction Company was ordered to provide assurances that the sewer system would be constructed, including plans (which were to be approved by the state), the date that construction was to begin, and the date that it would be operational. The Raritan Township Board of Commissioners additionally charged the Veterans Administration with extreme negligence in handling housing developments and with failing to protect veterans, who made up the majority of Stephenville's new home owners. The New Jersey Department of Health, however, proposed a plan in which a full sewer system and sewage treatment plant would be built in Stephenville, at a cost to be included in the purchase price of new homes. Tufaro objected to the plan stating that having a sewage plant in the community would depreciate property values and residential conditions.

In late May 1951, residents began taking possession of completed houses on Sky Top Road; in mid-June 1951, residents began taking possession of completed houses on Richard Road; and in mid-July 1951, residents began taking possession of completed houses on Stephenville Parkway. Around this time, Stephenville began to be labeled in newspapers as a sub-section of Raritan Township's Oak Tree neighborhood. This was due to the school district, which dictated that children in Stephenville attend the nearest educational institution, Oak Tree School, located at 2050 Oak Tree Road, at the intersection of Oak Tree and Plainfield Road. Stephenville was also covered by firefighter's District No. 5, which was based in Oak Tree and patrolled such areas as Potters Crossing and Oak Hills. In early August 1951, the Terra-Nova Construction Company had 245 Stephenville houses completed or under construction and was planning further developments closer to Oak Tree Avenue.

In late September 1951, Stephenville residents formed the Terra Nova Garden Club of Stephenville, a gardening club named in honor of the development company that founded the community. Tufaro was named an honorary member of the club. The club was formed as a local chapter of the already-established Cherrydell Garden Club of South Plainfield Borough, and named Mrs. Morris L. Puglisi as President. The club is still active in the 2020s. Residents also formed the Stephenville Women's Club in the late summer of 1951; the group was responsible for many charitable events during its existence. In October 1951, Stephenville residents petitioned for a school bus route to be added along Park Avenue to take their children to Oak Tree School. They also criticized the school's bus route limitations, which was unable to provide transportation for students who lived under two miles from the school, including residents on Plainfield Road.

The residents of Stephenville continued to complain about lack of drainage and septic tank backups in the community and again requested to halt the construction of new houses. Although the home owners had been promised a sanitary sewer system earlier in the year by the New Jersey Department of Health, Raritan Township Mayor James C. Forgione stated that such a construction was not financially possible for the township. Forgione also noted that all of the land north of the Borough of Metuchen had drainage issues but that the township had no authority to deny a property owner to build on his own land. The mayor instead proposed that a cooperative master sewer project be deployed in conjunction with the Borough Metuchen and South Plainfield Borough. Mayor Forgione was criticized for his lack of objectivity, for continuously coming to Tufaro's defense, and for giving the contractor an endless amount of second chances.

On November 27, 1951, Commissioner Julius C. Engel, then-Director of Public Safety for the Raritan Township Board of Commissioners and former Mayor of Raritan Township, held a meeting in which he criticized the township's politicians for their lack of efficiency to resolve Stephenville's sewage problem. Commissioner Engel was quoted as saying that "fellow members of the Board of Commissioners need to take positive action to halt construction in the Stephenville development or resign from office." Commissioners Engel and Russell B. Walker, chairman of the health board, pressed for an injunction in the New Jersey courts against the Terra-Nova Construction Company, but were again met with opposition from Mayor Forgione, who advocated that the contractor should be given more time. Mayor Forgione also expressed that Tufaro had the right to build on his own land as he pleased. Commissioner Engel further stated that the ranch homes in Stephenville had not been built up to code standards, which required houses to have a poured cellar; Stephenville ranch homes were built on concrete slabs. Stephenville residents charged that an agent of the developer was pumping out septic tanks and dumping the residue into open ditches intended for surface drainage and also on land in the north end of the development where it flowed into the Bound Brook-Stephenville Brook stream. Health officer G. Stanley VanSickle was dispatched to investigate the charges but was unable to track down the culprit.

Taking the matter into his own hands, immediately after the November 27, 1951 meeting, Commissioner Engel instructed township building inspector George Thompson to order a halt of construction at Stephenville's new 31-home Plainfield Road development. Thompson served an informal notice to the Terra-Nova Construction Company, which was surveying the land east of Plainfield Road that evening, but the order was ignored. Four days later, two formal notices were presented to the Terra-Nova Construction Company: one was delivered to the company's office; the other was nailed to the door of a field office at the construction site. The notice officially revoked the 31 building permits which Tufaro had obtained for the Plainfield Road extension a year prior, on December 12, 1950, through former Commissioner Walter C. Christensen. Commissioner Engel also announced that no further building permits would be issued in the north end of Raritan Township (north of the Borough of Metuchen) until a proper sewage system had been constructed. Tufaro contained that only a minority of the residents in Stephenville experienced septic tank issues, and who in turn had painted an exaggerated and unfair picture of the community. Tufaro also offered to refund the purchase price to any home owner wishing to move out of Stephenville.

On December 10, 1951, the Federal Economic Cooperation Administration presented a tour of the Stephenville community for ten French technicians and contractors visiting abroad. The community was singled out as an example of a well-built and well-planned, low-cost residential development. Tufaro told the French engineers that to date, Stephenville had 267 dwellings built or under construction and that 143 of them were occupied.

In mid-December 1951, Stephenville residents again brought up a complaint against the Oak Tree school district. While the school district had earlier that year agreed to provide bus transportation to Stephenville children via Park Avenue (because it consisted of a greater-than two mile distance from the school), the school district would be dispensing of that service once the Stephenville community was opened through to Plainfield Road, which reduced the distance from the school to less than a mile. Stephenville residents complained that Park Avenue and Plainfield Road were not safe walking routes for their children, due to thigh traffic, lack of sidewalks, and deep ditches cut along the sides of the roads. Mayor Forgione proposed that one of Stephenville's own streets, Harding Road (present day Harding Avenue), be extended northward to Oak Tree as a footpath, and that it be curved eastward so that the children would come out closer to Oak Tree School. Since the land between Stephenville and Oak Tree was still undeveloped owned by Raritan Township, the cost of creating the footpath would be minimal, and the township would then retain a right of way if and when Stephenville's development would extend north.

In mid-January 1952, Stephenville residents again appealed to the Raritan Township Board of Commissioners and the New Jersey Department of Health for a second investigation to be conducted into the community's sewer problem. Trenton, New Jersey–based Prosecutor Alex Eber was appointed to represent Stephenville residents in the New Jersey Department of Health public board hearings. Meanwhile, Tufaro optioned between 140 and 160 acres of undeveloped land from the Raritan Park Company, located east of Plainfield Road, across from the established Stephenville community and north of the 31-housing construction site on halt under Arrowhead Park. The land went east as far as Grove Avenue and north as far as Oak Tree Road, in a vast estate that once belonged to bridge engineer Gustav Lindenthal. On January 14, 1952, the residents formed the Stephenville Civic Association, unanimously appointing Donald Campbell as President. The association, which had the purpose of unifying the citizens of Stephenville into a common body and make policy for the residents of the development, met at the Oak Tree Firehouse. In late January 1952, residents began taking possession of completed houses on Maida Road and Homestead Road.

On February 13, 1952, Stephenville's unsanitary conditions complaint was heard in Trenton courts. Assistant Public Health Engineer Ernst Segesser testified that new sanitation tests had been conducted in the community. One such test included pouring a colored dye into exposed raw sewage flowing into a storm drain. Segesser explained that he was able to follow the dyed matter as it made its way back into the bathtubs of residents. Leight W. Morrill, Public Health Engineer of New Jersey, who conducted the hearing, requested a court injunction for the abatement of the pollution and against the developer of the Stephenville community. At the end of the hearings, the matter was turned over to Dr. Daniel Bergsma, New Jersey Health Commissioner. In late February 1952, residents began taking possession of completed houses on Harding Road.

On March 26, 1952, New Jersey Health Commissioner Dr. Daniel Bergsma brought a verdict that Raritan Township had 90 days (until July 1, 1952) to correct the pollution resulted from untreated sewage discharge in Stephenville. The State warned that the Raritan Township Board of Health could face court actions if the order was not followed, and sent notices to Commissioners Engel, Walker, Brace Eggert, and Martin J. O'Hara Sr., as well as to Mayor Forgione. On April 1, 1952, Mayor Forgione forced the responsibility back onto Stephenville residents by giving the homeowners two weeks to clear up and permanently resolve the sewage problem at their own expense. Mayor Forgione was quoted as saying "We have been lenient, we have been tolerating these conditions and have been trying to work with the residents of the developments to help them. But they bought the houses and legally are responsible for the health nuisances that exist." Commissioner Eggert, president of the Raritan Township Board of Health, was ordered by Mayor Forgione to send notices to the home owners by registered mail and threatened punishment under township health ordinance for failure to comply.

On April 8, 1952, Borough of Metuchen Mayor Joseph L. Costa came to Stephenville residents' rescue by offering to connect the community's sewage discharge to the Borough of Metuchen's existing treatment plant, providing that Raritan Township was willing to cover the cost of laying new pipes. It was later revealed that Tufaro had initiated the idea when he had reached out to Costa on March 20, 1952 with a proposal to run a sewer line down Plainfield Road from the forthcoming 31-home addition. Problems delayed the connection of Stephenville to the Borough of Metuchen's treatment plant when it was discovered that Plainfield Road would only provide a less-than-adequate two-foot fall, and would necessitate the construction of a pumping station.

On May 12, 1952, Campbell resigned as President of the Stephenville Civic Association. Thomas Spear, who served as acting president until one was appointed by votes later in the month, announced that the committee would erect street sings in Stephenville. On May 26, 1952, Horace Pearce was elected second President of the Stephenville Civic Association at a meeting held at the Borough of Metuchen's Saint Francis School. The association then included nearly 170 members.

On May 21, 1952, Frank P. Tufaro, his wife Stephania M. Tufaro, and business partner Mary G. LaVanco, filled for the incorporation of a new building and contracting company named Stephenville Homes, Incorporated. The incorporation papers were filed through County Clerk Henry G. Nulton in Elizabeth, New Jersey, and gave the corporation's address as 235 East Broad Street, Westfield, New Jersey. As all contractors were legally prevented from further development in Stephenville and other parts of northern Raritan Township until the sewage problem was resolved, Tufaro began building replica communities of Stephenville Ranch Homes in Union County, New Jersey, Middletown Township, New Jersey, Somerset County, New Jersey and Westchester County, New York. Through a secondary contracting corporation, Elm Construction Company, Tufaro reused architect Erwin Gerber's plans for four more communities named Stephenville Homes: one in Westfield, New Jersey; one in the Headden's Corner, Glendale Park and Fair View district of Red Bank, New Jersey; one in Bernardsville, New Jersey; and another in the Hartsdale district of Greenburgh, New York. Tufaro announced to the press that he planned to build 300 homes in Middletown Townships' Stephenville Homes community, and even named some of the streets the same way, including David, Frances, Maida, Richard, Sleepy Hollow and Stephenville. By 1955, Stephenville Homes in Middletown Township had been renamed Navesink Heights.

In early June 1952, residents began taking possession of completed houses on Frances Road and Flower Court. On June 13, 1952, three residents on Richard Road were charged with failing to comply with the New Jersey Department of Health order to cease septic tank overflow. On June 25, 1952, the Raritan Township Board of Commissioners requested a 30-day extension from the New Jersey Department of Health in order to fulfill Stephenville's sewer construction. In early August 1952, residents began taking possession of completed houses on Daniel Road. In mid-August 1952, the Raritan Township Board of Commissioners announced that an agreement with the Borough of Metuchen would be signed on September 15, 1952, establishing a cooperative sewage treatment for Stephenville. By mid-November 1952, however, the agreement still had not been signed.

On September 15, 1952, the Suz-Anne School for Retarded Children opened; it was the first school in Stephenville and was located at 1745 Park Avenue (the addresses on Park Avenue were later re-numbered by the township). The non-profit school was co-founded by Mrs. Jean McGurty and Mrs. Emma Blickle and was named after their daughters, Suzie McGurty and Mary Ann Blickle. At its opening, the school enrolled 20 students aged between 4 and 12.

With the community's sewage troubles seemingly nearing the end, Tufaro competed his purchase of 145 acres of land between Plainfield Road and Grove Avenue from the Raritan Park Company in mid-August 1952. The new portion of Stephenville was to feature high-priced homes of equal quality to the ones built in Arrowhead Park, and the land of each house would include half of an acre or more, with the homes listed as "farmettes". Tufaro appointed Raymond P. Wilson as development engineer and made a deal with J. Kingsley Powell as exclusive sales agent. Streets and utilities were scheduled to be laid in the fall of 1952 with housing construction to start early in 1953.

On November 18, 1952, it was announced that the Borough of Metuchen and Raritan Township had agreed on a five-year agreement for sewage treatment. Under the terms of the contract, the Borough of Metuchen would treat up to 200,000 gallons of sewage a day, with Raritan Township paying $55 for every million gallons treated. Raritan Township also agreed to pay the costs of constructing the sewer lines from Stephenville to the Borough of Metuchen's treatment plant. The New Jersey Department of Health was however not notified of this agreement and raised three objections. A revised contract between Raritan Township and the Borough of Metuchen was drawn up and agreed by both parties on March 12, 1953 and re-sent to the New Jersey Department of Health for final approval.

On April 22, 1953, Commissioner Engel announced that a stop sign would be installed at the intersection on Plainfield Road and Park Avenue. On May 13, 1953, the Raritan Township Board of Commissioners announced that the New Jersey Board of Health had approved the Stephenville-Metuchen sewer plan. The township next escalated the plans to the New Jersey Government Board for a certificate of necessity so that it could exceed its bonding limit and finance the sewer's construction, which they estimate would cost $260,000. In early June 1953, the Suz-Anne School for Retarded Children expanded its program with a summer camp, the only one of its kind in the State of New Jersey and one of only three in the United States. On August 12, 1953, the Raritan Township Board of Commissioners announced that the sewer's construction budget had been fully approved. The commissioners explained that part of the budget to cover the cost of construction was to come from "cash contributions", one such having been promised by Tufaro at an earlier time. The commissioners noted, however, that Tufaro had since sold pat of his holdings to another builder. On August 26, 1953, the Raritan Township Board of Commissioners passed an ordinance authorizing the construction of sewers in Stephenville; the event was reported by newspapers as " the ending of the longest and most bitter controversy in post-war township history."

On September 30, 1953, the Raritan Township Board of Commissioners awarded two contracts for the building of the sewer system. A sewer lines building contract was awarded to the Perelle Construction Company of Pemberton, New Jersey for $158,964.97; and a pumping station building contract was awarded to the Verona Construction Company of Verona, New Jersey for $34,725. The sewer system was given a June 1, 1954 deadline for completion, but it would not be operational for more than a year later.

=== Local community developments and oppositions (1953–1959) ===
On October 31, 1953, Tufaro sold the 145 acres of land that he had purchased between Plainfield Road and Grove Avenue, originally planned for an eastern extension of Stephenville. The purchase was made by the Absig Corporation, one of many subsidiaries of the Sommer Brothers Construction Company of Iselin, New Jersey, which had previously purchased the 31-home plot of land halted from construction between the Metuchen Golf and Country Club and Arrowhead Park. The Sommer Brothers Construction Company, through such subsidiaries as Tacert Company and Reliance Associates, was responsible for community developments in Iselin such as Chain O'Hills and Westbury Park, but had no immediate plans for development of a new community east of Stephenville. The Sommer Brothers Construction Company also purchased land adjacent to other Stephenville communities in New Jersey and New York that were developed by the Terra-Nova Construction Company, and with plans to extend those communities.

On November 25, 1953, Tufaro donated a 3-acre tract of land in Stephenville to Raritan Township for use as a playground; it was to be Stephenville's first park. Construction of the Oak Tree-Stephenville Park recreational facilities began on November 27, 1953. On December 16, 1953, Stephenville's North End Democratic Club protested against the installation of a gasoline station at the corner of Park Avenue and Stephenville Parkway, stating that the area had been zoned for light businesses only. The building permits for the gasoline station had been issued earlier that month and would be upheld by the township, leading to the construction of the Stephenville Cities Service station at 3875 Park Avenue. In November 1954, Raritan Township was renamed Edison Township.

In April 1955, the Edison Township Board of Schools looked into the possibility of building an elementary school in the Stephenville community. The community was still awaiting the completion of the sewer lines to the Borough of Metuchen, which had increased in cost up to $330,000. In June 1955, a second ordinance was passed for the completion of the sewer system. On July 13, 1955, Edison Township transferred 39.7 acres of land, previously referred to as the "Spear tract of land", to the Edison Township Board of Education for the construction of a new junior high school off of Plainfield Road. The area designated for the new school was bordered by Plainfield Road to the east, Oak Tree Road to the north, Harding Road to the west and Maida Road to the south, and met up with the Oak Tree-Stephenville Park.

On September 26, 1956, the Edison Township Board of Commissioners authorized Township Attorney Christian Jorgensen to issue an ordinance establishing Stephenville Parkway as a one-way thoroughfare. Although the road had been built and designated a one-way street from the beginning, residents complained that motorists ignored the signs and drove freely on either side of the road. By October 1959, the Edison Township Board of Education was looking to exchange the Spear tract of land it had purchased for a junior high school.

On March 4, 1957, Commissioner Martin J. O'Hara Sr. announced that the 38.7 Spear tract of land, which had been donated to Edison Township's Board of Education for the purposes of building a junior high school, would be transferred back to the Edison Township Board of Commissioners for it to be re-purposed, now that the Edison Township Board of Education had decided against building a school there. O'Hara stressed that the land would be used solely to expand the existing Oak Tree-Stephenville Park and would not be divided for business use. The Edison Township Board of Education later chose to build the school south of Stephenville, on the former Woodbrook Farms estate, leading to the construction of Woodbrook Elementary School and Woodrow Wilson Middle School, south of Stephenville. On May 13, 1957, the Stephenville Civic Association announced a plan to beautify the center isle of Stephenville Parkway, with a starting fund of $1000.

In March and April 1958, Stephenville residents objected to and successfully petitioned against a public swimming pool that was proposed as an addition to the Oak Tree-Stephenville Park. In May 1958, the Stephenville Civic Association objected to an application submitted by the Absig Corporation for the construction of $3,500,000, 13 two-story campus-type luxury garden apartment buildings (amounting to 286 residential units) on 45.5 acres across from Stephenville, off of Plainfield Road (between the Metuchen Golf and Country Club and Arrowhead Park) where Stephenville was originally meant to be extended. The Absig Corporation requested an exception be granted by the Edison Township Zoning Board of Adjustment for the apartment complex to be built in a Residence A Zone; Edison Township only permitted apartment buildings to be constructed in Residence B Zones. The Stephenville Civic Association claimed that apartments would cause a depreciation to the living conditions of Stephenville and its neighboring communities. The Pumptown Civic Group, the Oak Hills Civic Association, the Seaman Park Civic Association, and the Women for Edison also objected to the apartment project. When faced with opposition, the Absig Corporation quickly proposed alternate plans, including splitting the area in two; one for the apartment complex, the other for 31 residential homes (reusing Tufaro's original plans) to provide a "buffer zone" to the Stephenville and Arrowhead Park communities. The Absig Corporation also proposed a 77 residential home-project which could instead be built, with homes selling for $18,000 to $20,000. Debate over the construction of apartments and the Edison Township Zoning Board of Adjustments lasted several months, into July 1958. On September 16, 1958, the Absig Corporation withdrew their application for exception of zoning and abandoned their plan to build the Oak Hills Estates apartments across from Stephenville. In 1957, 255 acres of land adjacent easterly of Stephenville, across from Plainfield Road and which was once to be the eastern addition to Stephenville, was proposed as a new development named Oakview Heights by the Absig Corporation. The Oakview Heights project also fell through, and the acreage was partitioned off to several smaller developments, leading to the development of Hampshire Gardens, Chandler Hill, Edison Oaks, Glenwood Park, Carriage Hill, Briarwood East, Timber Grove, Woodcroft, Tamarack North and Woodcroft East.

In September 1958, Edison Township looked into extending Park Avenue and Stephenville Parkway westward. In October 1958, Stephenville resident, and former President of the Stephenville Civic Association, Robert Larson again proposed to build a private swimming club near the Oak Tree-Stephenville Park. The Woodside Swim Club, of which Larson was President, applied for a variance to permit construction of a $70,000 85-foot by 65-foot fan-shaped swimming pool, wading pool, bath house, recreation facilities, picnic area and parking area, on a 6-acre tract of land east of Harding Road with the Edison Township Zoning Board of Adjustment. The swimming club met with an equal amount of approval and opposition from residents of Stephenville and on November 18, 1958, the Edison Township Zoning Board of Adjustment granted their approval of the variance to permit the construction of the private swimming club. On November 23, 1958, residents opposing the private swim club met to discuss the issue and were interviewed by the press. Residents explained that they were not opposed to swimming pools but rather at the fact that the Edison Township was willing to pass an exception to allow the construction of public and business facilities in Residential AA areas, which by law was restricted to single-family dwellings. The passing of the exception would not only apply to the Woodside Sim Club but also to any future recreational facilities wishing to build in Residential AA zones. On November 26, 1958, the Woodside Swim Club's board-approved application was presented to the Edison Township Council for consideration and was approved. The Edison Township Council placed certain requirements on the Woodside Swim Club with which to comply in the residential neighborhood; it was required to construct an extension on Harding Road (which would extend north beyond Richard Road and Frances Road), it needed to install a gate of substantial construction at the driveway off Harding Road into the club (which became Woodside Court), it needed to maintain a wooded buffer zone of 20 to 100 feet in width around most of the tract of land, and it was not allowed to install a public address system on the premises.

In early November 1958, the Absig Corporation presented plans to build 77 residential homes in the 45-acre tract of land adjacent to Stephenville. On November 12, 1958, the Stephenville Civic Association again opposed the residential plans offered by Absig Corporation, claiming that "large-scale housing developments" should be banned by the Edison Township Council. The council noted that the proposed community development by Absig Corporation was located on a smaller tract of land and would include a lesser number of houses than Stephenville itself. On December 26, 1958, the Planning Board of Edison Township approved Absig Corporation's 77-dwelling plans and the development adjacent to Stephenville would be named Oak Hills Estates, an extension of the Oak Hills district near the Borough of Metuchen-Edison Township line, above Arrowhead Park. The development would, however, be sold to another contracting company which renamed it Tamarack-at-Oak-Hill.

On January 7, 1959, Alvin Wolf and Dr. Julius Seaman, Stephenville residents who had once been part of the committee to develop the Woodside Swim Club but had since become antagonists, filed suit in Superior Court against Edison Township and the private club. The plaintiffs were represented by Perth Amboy attorney Robert P. Levine. On January 21, 1959, the Woodside Swim Club asked the Planning Board of Edison Township for subdivision of part of the tract on which it was to be built. The private club asked for a swap of land owned by the Jersey Central Power and Light Company and part of the former Spear tract of land, which would result with Edison Township owning three parcels of land next to the swim club. By doing so, the Woodside Swim Club would be able to extend Harding Road northward towards Oak Tree and pave the street at its own expense, thereby limiting the amount of traffic going through Stephenville. Levine, present at the township meeting, opposed the proposition, claiming it had not been passed by the Edison Township Council. Edison Township Mayor Anthony M. Yelencsics and Edition Township attorney R. Joseph Ferenzci ruled that the matter had already been approved in November 1958.

In late February 1959, Stephenville residents complained about an inadequate storm sewer culvert under Park Avenue, which caused flood conditions during storms and affected newly built houses east of Park Avenue. On March 4, 1959, the Edison Township Planning Board approved the application of Woodside Swim Clubs' request for subdivision of acreage. The matter was taken up to Superior Court Judge Bernard W. Vogel on April 17, 1959, who in turn ruled that a new application needed to be made at township-level. The Edison Township Planning Board held new hearings on May 5, May 12, and May 19, 1959, ultimately re-approving of the club's plan to subdivide its tract on May 27, 1959. The Edison Township council added new clauses to the approval, noting that the Woodside Swim Club would need to use water supplied by a public utility company and build sanitary sewers. Construction of the Woodside Swim Club began in March 1960 and officially opened in June 1960.

On November 17, 1959, the Stephenville Women's Club announced it would donate $760 for the addition of shade trees on the streets of Stephenville. The trees were to be purchased through the Edison Shade Tree Committee at $10 a piece and were restricted to pine oak, Norway maple and honey locust.

=== Local community developments and oppositions (1960–1968) ===
On April 20, 1960, Stephenville residents joined with the Edison Township Planning Board in opposition to reject the residential development plans for the Holiday Homes community, which projected to build 76 residential homes northeast of Stephenville, on a plot of land east of Plainfield Road and off of Oak Tree Road. The Holiday Homes community had projected to relocate or remove Prospect Street, Washington Avenue and Bradford Road and subdivide land to smaller than legally allowed parcels for residential construction. The contractors revised their plans by increasing the plot sizes and reducing the number of homes to 60, and resubmitted their application to the Edison Township Planning Board under the name Vitality Estates. Vitality Estates was approved but was renamed Edison Oaks in 1961 and became a nearby neighborhood of Stephenville.

In June 1962, Edison Township announced the city's future Master Plan, which proposed the enlargement and extension of Stephenville Parkway into a multi-lane, high-traffic roadway. Stephenville Parkway was to be extended easterly to connect it with Oak Tree Road at the Grove Avenue intersection, and would be extended westerly through Dismal Swamp to meetup with Talmadge Road in South Edison Township near Interstate 287 and the industrial area. It was revealed that Edison Township's Master Plan had been in development by the Planning Board since 1952, and that, in an effort to accommodate of the growing population, the township hoped to divert some of the heavy traffic from Route 27. On August 15, 1962, 150 residents of Stephenville attended Edison Township's Planning Board meeting to criticize the proposal. They also protested a new street straightening out of a bend to connect Plainfield Road to Park Avenue.

On September 12, 1962, Spex Industries announced the construction of a new plant to be located at 3880 Park Avenue, across from Stephenville. It was the area's first industrial corporation and the company moved in during January 1963. On September 25, 1962, Stephenville resident Sidney Stephens became the owner of the Stephenville Cities Service station at 3875 Park Avenue.

On July 10, 1963, residents of Stephenville and the Stephenville Parkway area (including the former Oakview Heights, Carriage Hill, Tamarack North, Briarwood East and Timber Grove) gathered at the Edison Township Council meeting to protesting the Master Plan proposal of Stephenville Parkway being turned into a high-speed highway. Township Engineer John Zimmerman told the residents that the highway would become reality in two years. It was explained that Edison Township had long-ahead planned to have Stephenville Parkway meet up with Oak Tree Road at the Grove Avenue intersection, as notable by the northeasterly curve at the east end of Stephenville and the lack of housing developments beyond that point up to Grove Avenue. The residents complained that neither the home builders, residential developers, nor the Township Council, had warned any of the new home owners of these plans before the purchase of their houses. They also complained that it was poor residential planning from the township to conceive or allow that a highway be designated so close to homes. Residents were told that Stephenville Parkway had a median strip down the center of the streets in order to accommodate the Big Inch pipeline, and that their 35-foot front yards were so deep for the same reason; but they were suddenly aware that it was instead planned well-ahead of time that the city would use that extra space to enlarge Stephenville Parkway and pave over the pipeline. Councilman Bernard James Dwyer tried to appease the residents by explaining that it would only be a light traffic highway from Grove Avenue to Park Avenue and suggested that the residents take their plea to the Edison Township Planning Board.

The residents took the case up with the Edison Township Planning Board on August 21, 1963, asking that the highway be either routed elsewhere, or that the street be zoned for only light traffic instead of heavy traffic, eliminating buses and trucks. Councilman Dwyer, who was also a member of the Edison Township Planning Board, amended the Master Plan and reclassified Stephenville Parkway from a primary street to a secondary street, explaining that the high-grade residential development along the street warranted such a change.

The subject of turning Stephenville Parkway into a highway came up again a year and a half later. After additional protests from the residents, the Edison Township Planning Board proposed further zoning and Master Plan amendments on December 16, 1964. It was ruled that Stephenville Parkway would be designated a permanent local street and the Master Plan would be revised as to not longer develop an eastern addition, joining it with Oak Tree Road and Grove Avenue, or western addition, joining it with Talmadge Road. As such, Stephenville Parkway would remain as it was; ending at Park Avenue on the west and with a cul-de-sac end on the east. By changing the zoning of Stephenville Parkway, the residential setback was also amended to reduce the required front yard depth from 35 feet to 25 feet, unless individual neighborhood setbacks were greater.

On July 15, 1965, the Edison Township Council voted for an ordinance to install storm drains at the Stephenville Brook. On September 23, 1965, the Edison Township Municipal Council adopted an ordinance to repave the original section of Stephenville Parkway, between Park Avenue and Plainfield Road. The contract was awarded to the Lujak Contracting Company for $23,650. By 1966, the Stephenville Cities Service station at 3875 Park Avenue had been purchased by conglomerate Citgo Service station, and its new owner was Charles Kazar.

In the spring of 1966, Middlesex County Planning Director Douglas S. Powell surveyed Dismal Swamp west of Stephenville as a potential location for the construction of an airport. Powell suggested filling in and paving over the swamp, but Edison Township Mayor Anthony M. Yelencsics opposed the idea, citing it would be a public nuisance to the residents of Stephenville. Mayor Yelencsics instead proposed that a heliport be constructed at the former Raritan Arsenal.

Between June and December 1966, the Edison Township Council awarded several contracts to the Manganella & Preziosi Construction Company for the improvement for streets and drainage and the construction of storm sewers, culverts and concrete sidewalks, curbs and gutters in sections of Stephenville. $106,924 was devoted to the construction of a storm sewer, and $37,312 was devoted to the construction of a culvert, at Stephenville Brook. The entirety of Stephenville Parkway, from Park Avenue to Midland Road, was curbed and sidewalked and portions were guttered and repaved.

On December 14, 1966, residents of Stephenville and New Petrograd protested to the Edison Township Council about the nearby business operations of General Pallet Corporation, a wood pallet manufacturing company. The residents presented a petition of more than 200 names which complained of the heavy traffic through the residential streets, noise issues and parking problems due to the employees of the plant using residential streets to park their cars. It was also brought up that the area was zoned for light industrial manufacturing, which prohibited outside storing or warehousing of goods. Edison Township Council President Bernard James Dwyer told the residents that the council would investigate the area and take appropriate measures.

On April 14, 1967, the Middlesex County Planning Board gave preliminary approval to John and Joseph Gulya for the development of land immediately adjacent north of Stephenville. The new residential homes would be built off of a northern extension of Harding Road, north of Richard Road, and the community was named Sutton Hollow. Sutton Hollow was initially solely accessible through Stephenville Parkway, but Harding Road was eventually opened to Oak Tree Road; Harding Road was then renamed Harding Avenue.

In August 1967, Edison Township opened the new Woodbrook Elementary School, which was built south of Stephenville on the former Woodbrook Farms tract of land. The township, however, advertised the school as part of the Stephenville community, as it had no other immediate neighborhood in proximity. The $650,000 school had 14 classrooms designed by architect John MacWilliam of the Borough of Metuchen. On September 27, 1968, Edison Township Mayor Anthony M. Yelencsics announced that the township had been granted $48,650 from the Federal Office of Emergency Planning for disaster relief of damages caused by a storm on May 29, 1968. The grant was used to cover the financing of damages to municipal utilities, drainage facilities and storm debris clearance as well as reimburse the township for a $20,000 emergency resolution passed by the council to reconstruct a portion of the Stephenville Brook culvert.

=== Local community developments and oppositions (1969–1980) ===
On October 31, 1969, John A Phillips, Chairman of the Middlesex County Highway Department, announced that the entirety of Park Avenue would be repaved and the road shoulders would be reconstructed. The work was to be done in three potions: from Plainfield Road to Stephenville Parkway; from Stephenville Parkway to Oak Tree Road; and from Oak Tree Road to the South Plainfield Borough line. The project was part of Middlesex County's $500,000 road improvement program due and was given top-priority due to the many potholes. The repaving contract was awarded to Trap Rock Industries for $50,000, but due to poor weather, the wok was not completed until April 1970.

On July 21, 1971, the Middlesex County Planning Board recommended that Park Avenue, from Stephenville Parkway to the Union County line, and Oak Tree Road be widened from two to four lanes in an effort to reduce increased traffic jams. It was proposed that the improvement would be made by 1985 but this was never adopted.

On April 18, 1972, the Edison Township Zoning Board of Adjustments held a meeting to discuss a request from the Cities Service Company to tear down its gasoline service station at 3875 Park Avenue, cornering Stephenville Parkway, and rebuild a bigger and newer one on its 400-foot deep lot. A variance was required since the gas station was a non-conforming structure in the residentially zoned area. Nearly 20 Stephenville residents attended the meeting to protest the request, stating that the proposed gasoline station would be closer to their homes and would create additional traffic congestions. On May 26, 1972 the Edison Township Zoning Board of Adjustments voted in favor of Stephenville's residents and denied Cities Service Company's request.

By the 1970s, northern communities in Edison Township, including Stephenville, had an increase in crime due to its proximity to Potters Crossing. In early November 1972, Stephenville residents Elizabeth Toth and Barbara Boyce formed the Ad Hoc Committee for Community Safety, announcing to the news that robberies, rapes, muggings and other assorted vandalisms in Stephenville and other sections of North Edison Township had to end. The gasoline service station at the corner of Park Avenue and Stephenville Parkway had also been subject to numerous robberies over the years. The group fought for the creation of a second police precinct in North Edison Township, citing lack of police response and police patrols. The group was supported by Roosevelt Moses, a spokesman and resident of Potters Crossing. Edison Township Business Administrator John A. Delesandro and Edison Township Police Chief William Fisher both opposed the proposition, noting that only a minority of residents experienced those crimes. Chief Fisher also pointed out that 12 additional uniformed patrolmen and 3 new cars would be added to its 118-man police force as part of the 1973 budget, which he felt would be sufficient to combat any rise in crime the northern communities were experiencing. Edison Township Mayor Bernard James Dwyer did agree to install 45 new street lights in the Stephenville area, which would add to the safety of the residents.

=== Local community developments and oppositions (1980–2000) ===
In December 1981 and January 1982, two cluster housing developments adjacent to Stephenville were approved for building: Woodbrook Corners and Park Place Mews. Woodbrook Corners, a residential development made up of 493 single and two-family living units, was to be built by Robert Karnell southwest from Stephenville, south of Park Avenue on the former Woodbrook Farms location. Stephenville residents opposed the development, complaining about already-present traffic problems, but were overruled by the Edison Township Planning Board on December 16, 1981.

The second development, Park Place Mews, proposed a $35,000,000, 42-acre tract development of 285 single-family townhouse condominiums, with a recreative center, tennis courts and a swimming pool, west of Stephenville. Park Place Mews was to be built by Barry Rosengarten and would have a private entrance off of Park Avenue across from Stephenville Parkway. Stephenville and New Petrograd residents opposed this new development as well, again citing traffic congestion increases, but were again overruled by the Edison Township Planning Board on January 20, 1982. Woodbrook Corners and Park Place Mews would initially have most of its traffic routed through Stephenville, but throughout the 1980s, Edison Township extended Talmadge Road westerly to connect it with Park Avenue, allowing direct traffic from South Edison Township. Park Place Mews was ultimately renamed Park Gate and had its opening in September 1983. On September 22, 1982, the Edison Township Council issued a $350,000 ordinance for street repairs in the township, including extensive repair on Stephenville Parkway.

On November 21, 1984, 130 Stephenville residents attended the Edison Township Planning Board meeting to protest Leonard Sendelsky's application to build a 15,300-square foot office-retail building on 1.1 acre of land at the corner of Richard Road and Stephenville Parkway. Sendelsky's attorney, Gordon Berkow, insisted that the land was designated as a light business zone, as per the latest 1982 Edison Township zoning map. The residents, however, brought out historical zoning maps of Edison Township, showing that the parcel of land had originally been designated as residential, explaining that it had intentionally been left undeveloped as a buffer between houses and the gasoline service station at the corner of Park Avenue and Stephenville Parkway. Stephenville residents also shared their discovery that the 1.1 acre of land had never received any application for rezoning, and that it had in fact mistakenly been labeled as a local business zone on a 1972 revision zoning map. This erroneous 1972 zoning map was used when Edison Township revised its master zoning map in 1978, perpetuating the land as a local business zone. Stephenville residents further noted that the township's 1982 revision zoning map carried the same mistake.

In response of the debate, Berkow declared that any proof of fault in Edison Township's zoning maps would only place the zoning of the entire township into question and would force a jury to rule in favor of the developer. The Edison Township Planning Board requested a 45-day extension for further legal investigation but Sendelsky, who was in a position to decline the request, denied noting that any in opposition to the project at present time would be in opposition a month and a half later. The Edison Township Planning Board was thereby forced to initiate a vote, resulting in a 4 to 3 vote in favor of approving the application. Those in opposition included Edison Township Planning Board Chairman William Bohn, Edison Township Planning Board Vice-Chairman Marion Tekejian, and Edison Township Planning Board member Angelo Orlando.

100 Stephenville residents then attended the November 28, 1984 Edison Township Council meeting to protest Sendelsky's application. The residents were represented by attorney Andre Gruber, while Sendelsky hired a new attorney, Martin Hutt. Before and during the meeting, Edison Township Councilman George A. Spadoro said that he would go as far as to urge that the 1.1-acre tract of land be condemned by the township and turned into a park, if it was necessary to halt Sendelsky's plans. The Edison Township Council responded to the residents' appeal by unanimously endorsing a resolution sending the matter back to the Edison Township Planning Board for further review. The resolution was later amended at the urging of Councilman George Spadoro to indicate the council's support for preserving the integrity of Stephenville's residential neighborhood. In addition, the council voted to obtain a legal opinion on whether it can introduce an amendment to the land-use ordinance that would reclassify the land back to a residential zone without the Edison Township Planning Board's input. Sendelsky responded to the Edison Township Council's support by threatening to file a Superior Court civil rights suit against Edison Township if it had a hand in preventing his development.

On December 19, 1984, the Edison Township Planning Board agreed not to stand in the way of the Edison Township Council's plans to issue an immediate ordinance to rezone the 1.1 acre of land to back residential. On December 26, 1984, the Edison Township Council officially amended the 1.1-acre tract of land from a local business zone back to a residential zone. Councilmen Sidney Frankel and John Hogan opposed the rezoning, predicting that the amendment would be questioned in Superior Court in the event that Sendelsky proceeded with his threats. Councilman Angelo Orlando, who was a member of both the Edison Township Planning Board and the Edison Township Council, noted that it was the responsibility of city officials to uphold the rights of the people in such matters. Stephenville residents responded to Orlando's support by pledging to defend the township in Superior Court, if the case ever went so far.

Sendelsky and his attorney Gordon Berkow claimed that under state law, Edison Township Planning Board's approval was unaffected by Edison Township Council's zoning change for two years, which allowed him to proceed with receiving building permits and the erection of the office space. Sendelsky proceeded with his Superior Court suit. On August 8, 1985, Superior Court Judge Robert P. Figarotta ruled that Edison Township Council's amendment was not effective towards Sendelsky's application, but that due to a violation of the Sunshine Act, in which the Edison Township Planning Board held a session closed to the applicant to discuss the zoning matter, the board was forced to revote on Sendelsky's application. On August 21, 1985, the Edison Township Planning Board held a revote session but prohibited any hearings from the public. The Edison Township Planning Board's vote came out 4-2, in favor of Sendelsky, with only Councilman Angelo Orlando and Mayor Anthony M. Yelencsics opposing the development. Sendelsky immediately applied for building permits of the Stephenville Park Plaza building, which was to include a mix of local businesses and luxury office suites.

== Notable residents ==
- Susan Sarandon, her parents and eight siblings lived at 34 Williams Road from 1950 to 1964. Her mother was on the board of directors of the Stephenville Women's Club and the Terra Nova Garden Club; further, the family was member to the Woodside Swim Club where Sarandon and her sisters won many swimming competitions.

== See also ==
- List of neighborhoods in Edison, New Jersey
