= New Durham, Middlesex County, New Jersey =

Populated place in Middlesex County, New Jersey, US

New Durham, New Jersey
- Unincorporated community
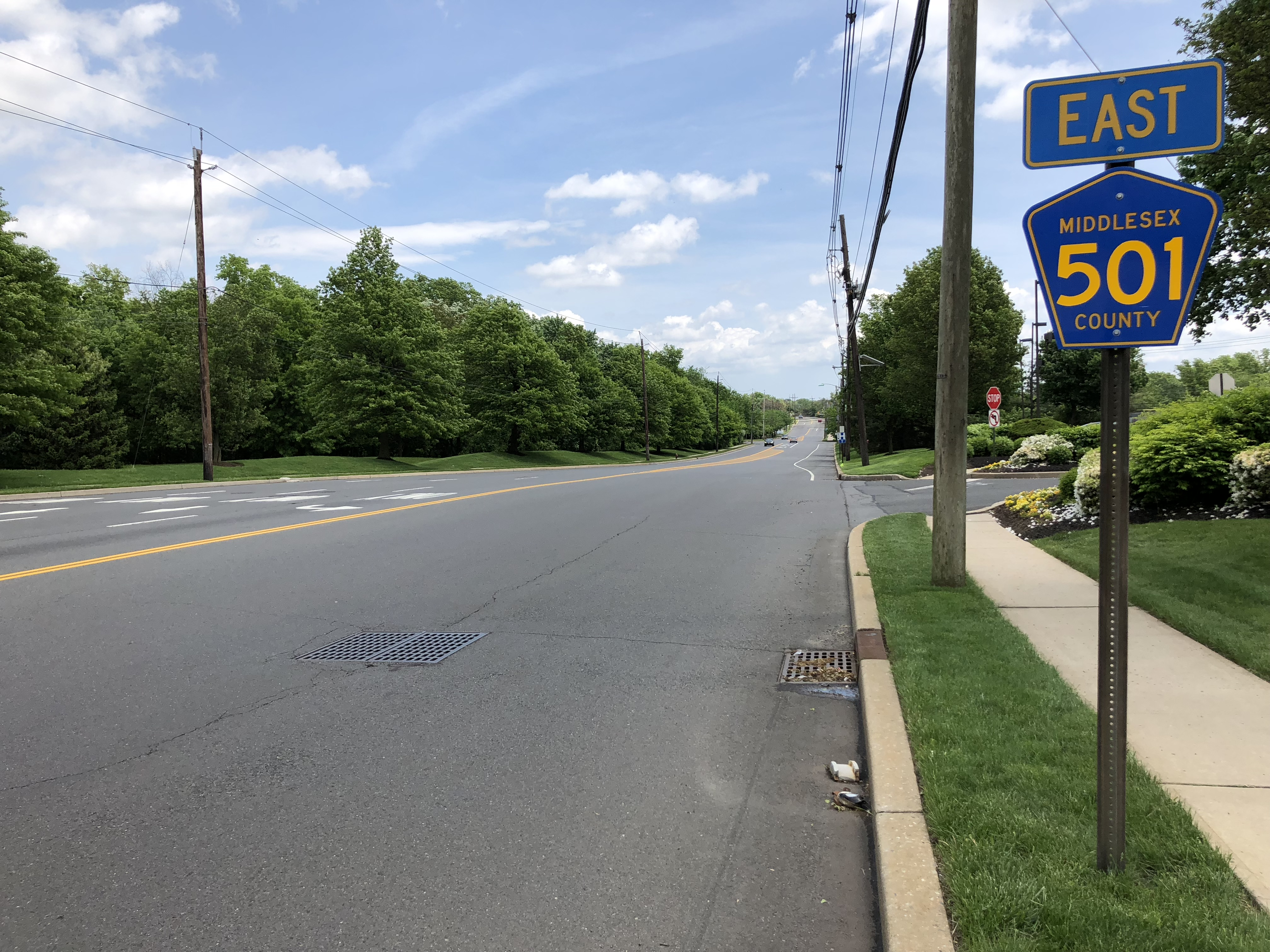
- CR 501 (New Durham Road) in the community

- Location in Middlesex County New Durham (New Jersey) New Durham (the United States)
- Coordinates: 40°32′37″N 74°24′22″W
- Country: United States
- State: New Jersey
- County: Middlesex
- Township: Edison
- Elevation: 131 ft (40 m)
- GNIS feature ID: 878731

New Durham was an unincorporated community and now a neighborhood located within Edison in Middlesex County, in the U.S. state of New Jersey, south of Dismal Swamp.

Along with Piscatawaytown, Bonhamtown, New Dover and Stelton, New Durham is one of the older historical crossroad communities established in Edison (either as once part of Piscataway or Woodbridge before the establishment of Raritan Township, as Edison was earlier known). It was described in 1834 as having a tavern, a store, and a half-dozen dwellings.

New Durham continued to appear as a distinct settlement on maps of the area into the late 19th and early 20th centuries. An 1882 map of Edison Township shows a New Durham School in the settlement, while maps from the early 20th century continue to identify New Durham as one of the communities within the township. The settlement's name has continued in use, including in the name of New Durham Road, which remains a principal local road through the area.

== See also ==
- Edison, New Jersey natural gas explosion
- List of neighborhoods in Edison, New Jersey
