= Stelton =

Stelton may refer to:

- Stelton, New Jersey
  - Stelton Baptist Church, Edison
  - Stelton station, now called Edison (NJT station)
