= Briarwood East, New Jersey =

Unincorporated community in Edison, New Jersey

- Unincorporated community
- Location of Stephenville in Middlesex County Inset: Location of county within the state of New Jersey Briarwood East, New Jersey (New Jersey) Briarwood East, New Jersey (the United States)
- Coordinates: 40°34′12″N 74°21′49″W
- Country: United States
- State: New Jersey
- County: Middlesex
- Township: Edison
- Established: 1963
- Elevation: 141 ft (43 m)
- ZIP Code: 08820
- Area codes: 732 and 908

Briarwood East is an unincorporated community and residential neighborhood located within Edison Township in Middlesex County, New Jersey, United States. It is located in the northern half of Edison Township; east of Carriage Hill, south east of Glenwood Park and Chandler Hill, south of the Oak Tree Park, west of Timber Grove and north of Tamarack North. The community is centered on the eastern half of Stephenville Parkway, a median strip-street which runs the entirety of the neighborhood between George Avenue and Midland Road.

Briarwood East was established in 1963 and consists mainly of ranch-style, bi-level and split-level homes. The community was developed by contractors Jack J. Handshush and Albert Handshuh through their building and development firm Hand-Sum Homes. Briarwood East was named after Briarwood, a similar community previously developed by the Handshuh brothers in Berkeley Heights, New Jersey.

== History ==
The land on which Briarwood East sits was once owned by bridge engineer Gustav Lindenthal. After his death in 1935, the land was donated to Raritan Township. In January 1952, Frank P. Tufaro optioned between 140 and 160 acres of undeveloped land from the Raritan Park Company between Plainfield Road, Grove Avenue and Oak Tree Road. Tufaro intended to build an eastern addition to Stephenville, a residential community which he had developed through his firm, Terra-Nova Construction Company. Tufaro completed his purchase of 145 acres in mid-August 1952, planning for large residential homes to be built on the site, adjoining Arrowhead Park. Streets and utilities were scheduled to be laid in the fall of 1952, with housing construction to start early in 1953, but delay in sewer construction for the original Stephenville development kept things on hold.

On October 31, 1953, Tufaro sold the 145 acres of land between Plainfield Road, Grove Avenue and Oak Tree Road to the Absig Corporation, one of the many subsidiaries of the Sommer Brothers Construction Company of Iselin, New Jersey. In November 1954, Raritan Township was renamed Edison Township. After several failed attempts to develop the land as a residential community named Oakview Heights in 1958 and 1959, the Absig Corporation sold off parcels of land to various developers, each of which established and built separate residential developments under various names. Joseph Deutsch and Jack W. Denholtz of Westover Realty acquired 37 acres of land in 1960 and hoped to build 62 houses but were denied by the Edison Township Planning Board due to lack of sewer connections.

Briarwood East was announced in May 1963, as a new community developed by Jack J. Handshuh and Albert Handshuh through their firm Hand-Sum Homes. The community was to be built on and off Stephenville Parkway, between Plainfield Road, Grove Avenue and Oak Tree Road, and adjacent to Carriage Hill, Glenwood Park, Chandler Hill, Timber Grove and Tamarack North (all residential communities built by developers who bought parcels from the planned Oakview Heights). Briarwood East was named after Briarwood, a similar community which the Handshuh brothers had developed in Berkeley Heights, New Jersey. The first homes in Briarwood East were built during the spring of 1963, and residents began moving into the community during the fall of 1963. In May 1964, Briarwood East residents formed the Oak-Grove Civic Association and successfully protested against the construction of a Socony-Mobil Oil Company gasoline service station at the corner of Oak Tree Road and Grove Avenue. The Oak-Grove Civic Association also successfully protested against the enlargement of Stephenville Parkway for the purpose of turning it into a highway, which proposed to connect it to Route 27 and Talmadge Road.

== See also ==
- List of neighborhoods in Edison, New Jersey
