= New Dover, New Jersey =

Populated place in Middlesex County, New Jersey, US

- Unincorporated community
- Location in Middlesex County New Dover (New Jersey) New Dover (the United States)
- Coordinates: 40°35′06″N 74°20′36″W
- Country: United States
- State: New Jersey
- County: Middlesex
- Township: Edison
- Elevation: 141 ft (43 m)
- GNIS feature ID: 878730

New Dover is an unincorporated community located within Edison Township in Middlesex County, in the U.S. state of New Jersey. The neighborhood began as colonial village that was part of adjacent Woodbridge Township. Along with Bonhamtown, New Durham and Stelton, it is one of the older historical communities of the township.

== See also ==
- List of neighborhoods in Edison, New Jersey
