= Bonhamtown, New Jersey =

Populated place in Middlesex County, New Jersey, US

- Unincorporated community
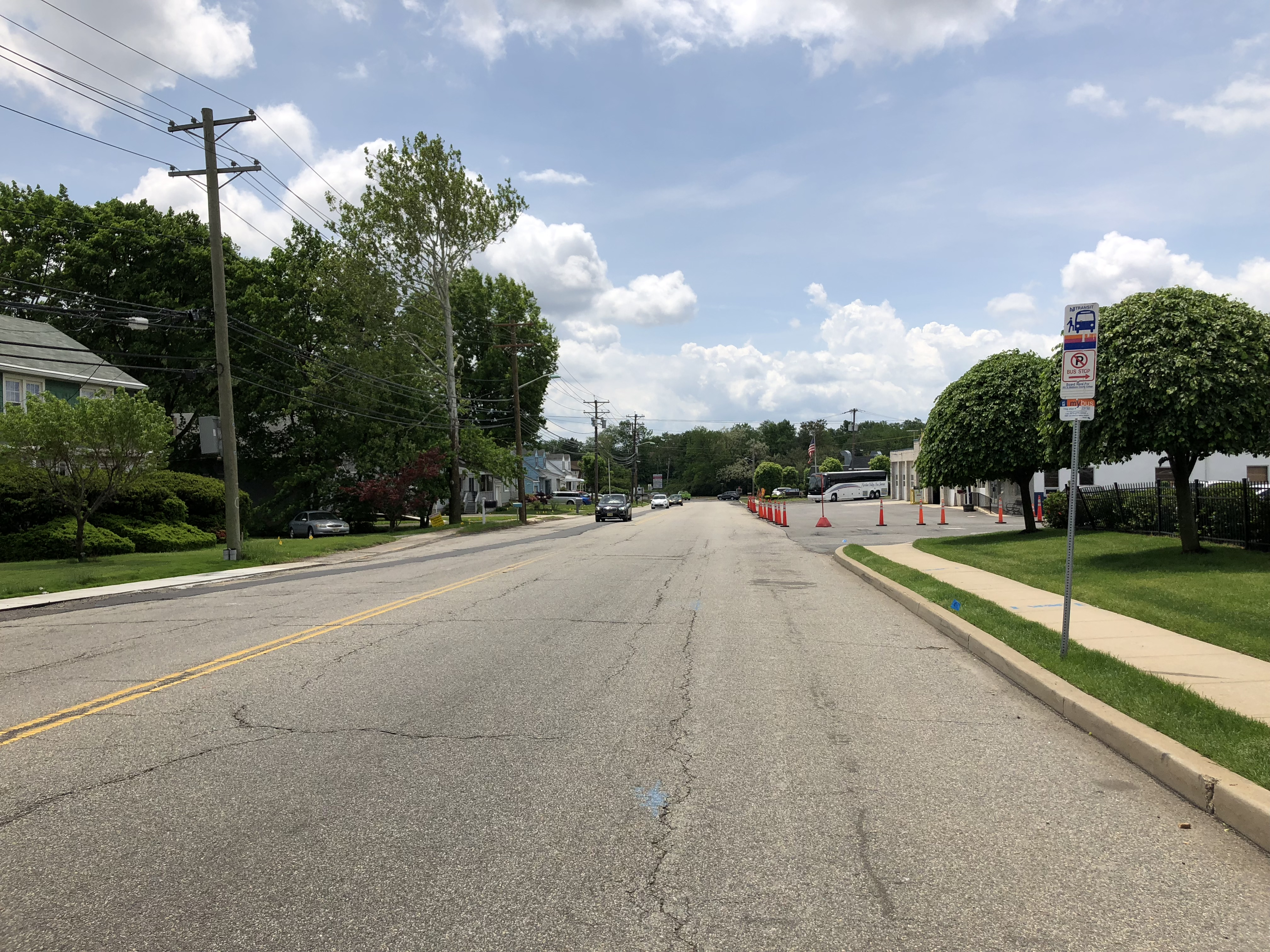
- Main Street at Morris Avenue

- Location of Bonhamtown in Middlesex County Inset: Location of county within the state of New Jersey Bonhamtown (New Jersey) Bonhamtown (the United States)
- Coordinates: 40°31′24″N 74°21′28″W
- Country: United States
- State: New Jersey
- County: Middlesex
- Township: Edison
- Elevation: 72 ft (22 m)
- ZIP code: 08837
- GNIS feature ID: 874849

Bonhamtown is a section of Edison in Middlesex County, in the U.S. state of New Jersey.

== History ==
The area was named after Nicholas Bonham, a freeholder from the 17th century. Along with New Dover, New Durham, and Stelton, it is one of the older historical communities established before the present-day municipality was incorporated. The historical community of Bonhamtown was originally part of Woodbridge Township. Bonhamtown became part of Raritan Township in 1870 when it was formed from portions of Woodbridge and Piscataway townships. Raritan Township was renamed Edison Township in 1954.

Bonhamtown was the site of the Battle of Punk Hill in March 1777, a skirmish between American militias and regulars facing 3,000 British soldiers that took place during the Forage Wars during the American Revolutionary War.

== Geography ==
Bonhamtown is surrounded by several major roads, which include: Interstate 287, the New Jersey Turnpike, U.S. Route 1, Route 27, and Route 440.

The Bonhamtown Branch of Conrail Shared Assets Operations runs through the area from the Northeast Corridor to Raritan Center, site of the former Raritan Arsenal.

== See also ==
- List of neighborhoods in Edison, New Jersey
