= New Durham, New Jersey =

New Durham, New Jersey may refer to:

- New Durham, North Bergen, New Jersey
- New Durham, Middlesex County, New Jersey
