= Edison Oaks, New Jersey =

Populated place in Middlesex County, New Jersey, US

- Unincorporated community
- Location of Stephenville in Middlesex County Inset: Location of county within the state of New Jersey Edison Oaks, New Jersey (New Jersey) Edison Oaks, New Jersey (the United States)
- Coordinates: 40°34′27″N 74°22′15″W
- Country: United States
- State: New Jersey
- County: Middlesex
- Township: Edison
- Established: 1961
- Elevation: 141 ft (43 m)
- ZIP Code: 08820
- Area codes: 732 and 908

Edison Oaks is an unincorporated community and residential neighborhood located within Edison Township in Middlesex County, in the U.S. state of New Jersey. It is located in the northern half of Edison Township; south of Oak Tree, east of the Oak Tree Tennis Courts, west of the Oak Tree Park, and north of Glenwood Park, Glenwood Heights and Hampshire Gardens. The community is bordered by Oak Tree Road to the north, Warwick Road to the east, and Peru Street to the south and west, with Whitehall Avenue in the center.

Edison Oaks was developed by Alfred C. Vitale through his development firm Vitality Estates between 1960 and 1961. The community consists of 60 ranch-style bi-level and split-level homes designed by architect S. J. Potter. The houses were built between 1961 and 1962 by contractors John Cali and Ignatius Seminara of the building firm Cali Associates, with residents moving into the new homes starting in autumn 1962.

== History ==
=== Oakview Heights and Holiday Homes (1957–1960) ===
The land on which Edison Oaks sits was once owned by bridge engineer Gustav Lindenthal. After his death in 1935, the land was donated to Raritan Township. In 1957, a 255-acre development known as Oakview Heights was to be built on most of the land located between Plainfield Road, Oak Tree Road, Grove Avenue and the Metuchen Golf and Country Club in Edison Township. Once this development fell through, portions of Oakview Heights were sectioned off to smaller developers.

On February 2, 1960, Kenilworth, New Jersey–based developer Alfred C. Vitale incorporated the development firm, Vitality Estates, Incorporated. Two months later, Vitale presented his plan to construct 76 residential homes on 26.3 acres of land south of Oak Tree Road and east of Plainfield Road to the Edison Township Planning Board. The development, named Holiday Homes, was to be constructed on paper streets Prospect Street (present day Peru Street), Washington Avenue (present day Whitehall Avenue) and Jackson Avenue (present day Warwick Road).

An Edison Township Planning Board meeting was held on April 20, 1960, to review Vitality Estates' proposal for Holiday Homes. At the meeting, Edison Township Mayor Anthony Yelencsics, as well as 30 residents of neighboring communities of Stephenville, Hampshire Gardens and Oak Tree, voiced their objections of the proposed community's lot sizes, which had been subdivided to the smallest legally-allowed parcels for residential construction. They complained that Residential A Zone housing required larger plots of land in the area and allowing the developer to construct smaller houses would downgrade the area. The Edison Township Fire Department also objected to the positioning of the streets. The Edison Township Planning Board denied Vitality Estates' Holiday Homes proposal.

=== Vitality Estates (1960–1961) ===
Vitale spent the next month revising the building plans and plots sizes of the community with architect S. J. Potter. In June 1960, Vitale submitted a new 60-home residential project named Vitality Estates, which proposed the construction of 18 houses in a Residence A Zone and 42 houses in a Residence B Zone, each on a half-acre plot and priced between $19,000 to $23,000. On July 20, 1960, the Edison Township Planning Board gave a conditional approval of the 60-home Vitality Estates development, subject to the approval of the Middlesex County Planning Board. Edison Township Engineer John Zimmerman recommended that the development extend its storm and sanitary sewers north along Oak Tree Road. The Edison Township Fire Department again objected to the development because Prospect Street would not meet up with and connect through to Chandler Road, which would hamper fire truck access. On August 17, 1960, the Edison Township Planning Board gave a preliminary approval to Vitality Estates.

On April 17, 1961, Vitale incorporated the development firm Vitality Estates, Limited, which acted as a legal successor to Vitality Estates, Incorporated by virtue of dissolution and received the deeds to the development. On April 20, 1961, the Edison Township Planning Board gave the developer final approval and the go-ahead to build the Vitality Estates - Section 1: the 17 homes in its Residential A Zone. On May 26, 1961, Edison Township Building Inspector George Thompson sanctioned the construction three model homes in Vitality Estates, two were to be priced at $17,000, the other at $18,000.

=== Edison Oaks (1961–1963) ===
On July 5, 1961, a new corporation named Edison Oaks, Incorporated, was registered; it was at this time that Vitality Estates became known as Edison Oaks. On September 8, 1961, building contractors John Cali and Ignatius Seminara of Cali Associates announced that four model homes were open to visits in Edison Oaks; all four were priced at $23,990. The residences in the development were custom built ranch-style or colonial-style split level or bi-level homes, fully equipped with air conditioning, four or five bedrooms, two and a half bathrooms, two-car garages, a finished recreation room, a living room with picture or bay window, full-sized dining room, full basements and modern kitchens.

By the end of September 1961, ten of the homes had been purchased, exclusively through Hy Ballon of Jacobson, Goldfarb and Tanzman. In December 1961, Cali Associates began building a fifth model home. In late January 1962, project director Seminara announced that all utilities had been installed in the development's first section, the roads had been cut through, and the lots had been brought to grade. Construction had also started on the first fifteen homes, with delivery predicted for the late winter of 1962.

On February 21, 1962, the Edison Township Planning Board gave final approval and the go-ahead to build Edison Oaks - Section 2: the 43 homes in its Residential B Zone. In March 1962, Prospect Street (which had temporarily been renamed Prospect Avenue) was officially renamed Peru Street; Washington Avenue was renamed Whitehall Avenue and Jackson Avenue was renamed Warwick Avenue once it was extended to connect with the existing road in Carriage Hill and Glenwood Park. By May 1962, 30 of the 60 homes in Edison Oaks had been sold.

In early June 1962, the last 20 homes in Edison Oaks was opened for sale. By mid-June 1962, 45 of the 60 homes had been sold. On July 17, 1962, Edison Oaks, Incorporated requested a variance from the Edison Township Zoning Board of Adjustment to build a home on an irregular-shaped lot, located at 23 Warwick Road. The request went through three appeals before it was finally approved on August 13, 1962, giving the builders permission to build the house at an angle facing the corner of Peru Street and Warwick Road.

In early November 1962, Seminara announced that 20 families had taken title to their residences and that Cali Associates would deliver the remaining of the 60 homes before the end of the year. By February 1963, 44 families had taken titles of their homes in Edison Oaks, and 51 properties had been sold. In mid-March 1963, Cali Associates announced that 54 of the houses had been sold and that more than 50 had been delivered. By the summer of 1963, all 60 homes in Edison Oaks had been sold.

== See also ==
- List of neighborhoods in Edison, New Jersey
