= List of neighborhoods in Edison, New Jersey =

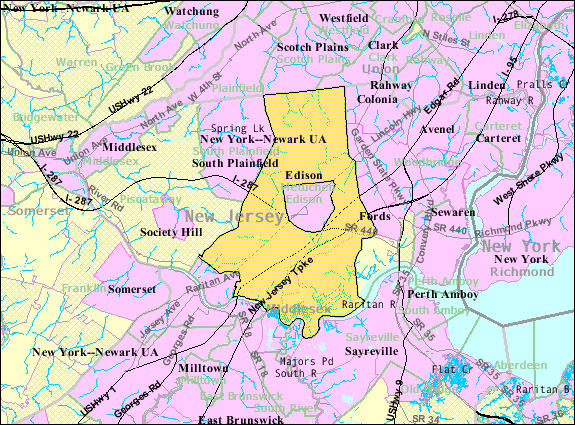
Metuchen lies at the geographic center of Edison

Edison, New Jersey is a township in Middlesex County, New Jersey in central New Jersey. The township was originally founded as the settlement of Piscatawaytown, a small neighborhood that still exists within it, and incorporated as Raritan Township on March 17, 1870.

As of the 2020 United States census, Edison had a total population of 107,588, making it the sixth-most populous municipality in New Jersey. The township had a total area of 30.638 square miles (79.351 km^{2}).

Edison is crisscrossed by several major roads, including Interstate 287, the New Jersey Turnpike, U.S. Route 1, Route 27, and Route 440, with various sections and neighborhoods interspersed between them. Large acreages of the closed Raritan Arsensal, Camp Kilmer and the Edison Assembly have given way to mixed-use projects.

Some historic settlements date back to the 17th century. Until the later part of the 20th century, the township comprised several rural crossroad communities, the borders of which became less distinct with suburban development. The sprawling township does not have an actual "downtown". A section in the center of Raritan Township was ceded to create the Borough of Metuchen on March 20, 1900. While Metuchen is a separate municipality, it remains fully enclaved by, and is the geographic center of Edison, making Edison a so-called 'doughnut' town.

== List of sections and neighborhoods ==
Name	Image	Coordinate	Notes	References
Arrowhead Park		40°33′53″N 74°22′20″W	A community in north Edison bordering Plainfield Road to the west, Tamarack-at-Oak-Hill to the east, Carriage Hill to the north and Oak Hills to the south. It centers around Southfield Road and Longview Road.	
Bonhamtown	Main Street at Morris Avenue in Bonhamton	40°31′24″N 74°21′28″W	The neighborhood began as colonial village that was part of Woodbridge Township. It is named after Nicholas Bonham, a freeholder from the 17th century. Along with New Dover, New Durham, and Stelton it is one of the older historical communities established in the colonial era.	
Briarwood East		40°34′12″N 74°21′49″W	An area east of Carriage Hill, west of Timber Grove and north of Tamarack North.	
Camp Kilmer site		40°31′15″N 74°24′47″W	Abutting the Livingston Campus (Rutgers University) in Piscataway, the Edison portion of the former military base has been redeveloped, partially as housing.	
Carriage Hill		40°34′08″N 74°22′12″W	East of Stephenville, south of Hampshire Gardens, west of Briarwood East and north of Tamarack North and Arrowhead Park.	
Clara Barton	Amboy Avenue	40°32′03″N 74°20′22″W	Named for Clara Barton. Located in the eastern part of the sprawling township, Clara Barton is more urban in its density and has a small central business district on Amboy Avenue. The "village-like" section of is separated from the township's bustling highways and stretches of retail and is home to one of the township's three public libraries. The Middlesex Greenway runs through the neighborhood.	
Clive Hills		40°33′14″N 74°21′45″W	A residential area straddling the Edison and Metuchen border along Conrail Shared Assets Operations's Port Reading Secondary south of the Metuchen Golf and Country Club	
Edison Oaks		40°34′27″N 74°22′15″W	Edison Oaks is a residential community bordered by Oak Tree Road to the north, Peru Street to the south and west and Warwick Road to the east. The community was developed by Vitality Estates in the early 1960s.	
Greensand		40°29′30″N 74°23′14″W	Site of the Kin-Buc Landfill, where Edmonds Creek mouths at the Raritan River. Heller Industrial Park is a built on a former sand mine.	
Hampshire Gardens		40°34′15″N 74°22′20″W	East of Stephenville, north of Carriage Hill and Glenwood Park, south and west of Chandler Hill.	
Haven Homes		40°30′34″N 74°24′23″W		
Lahiere		40°31′08″N 74°24′09″W	Lahiere is a neighborhood in the Stelton section near Edison station.	
Lincoln Park		40°31′15″N 74°23′06″W	Formerly called Lincoln Village. For other places named Lincoln Park, New Jersey, see Lincoln Park, New Jersey (disambiguation).	
Lindenau		40°30′15″N 74°24′43″W	Lindenau is a neighborhood of the Stelton section near Edison station.	
Martins Landing		40°29′35″N 74°23′59″W	Located on the northern banks of the Raritan River at the mouth of Martins Creek between the Basilone and Goodkind bridges.	
Menlo Park		40°33′54″N 74°20′15″W	Menlo Park is where, in 1876, Thomas Edison set up his home and research laboratory.	
Metuchen Golf and Country Club		40°33′32″N 74°21′49″W	A private club and golf course sited on approximately 130 acres of the former Gustav Lindenthal estate; incorporated in 1915 and named after the Metuchen, but entirely within Edison	
Metropark		40.56808°N 74.329795°W	Largely located in neighboring Iselin, the office park built around Metropark station on New Jersey Route 27	
Middlesex County College		40°30′21″N 74°21′58″W	Sited 159 acres (64 ha) of the former Raritan Arsenal.	
New Dover		40°35′06″N 74°20′36″W	The neighborhood began as colonial village that was part of adjacent Woodbridge Township.	
New Durham	New Durham Road	40°32′37″N 74°24′22″W		
New Petrograd		40°34′06″N 74°23′21″W	Originally intended as a Russian emigre community, the area is southeast of the South Plainfield border at the Dismal Swamp. It is bordered by Park Avenue to the east, Nevsky Street to the south, Delaney Street to the west and Universal Avenue and the Lehigh Line (Conrail) to the north. It is located southwest of the Oak Tree district, west of Stephenville and north of Pumptown Corners and Wood Brook Farms.	
Nixon		40°30′51″N 74°22′03″W	An area in south Edison	
Nixon Park		40°31′47″N 74°20′28″W	A residential development in South Edison	
North Edison		40°36′00″N 74°22′39″W	An area once known as Mount Pleasant, bordered by Scotch Plains to the north, Inman Avenue to the south, Woodland Avenue to the west, and Rahway Road to the east	
Oak Hills		40°33′17″N 74°22′06″W	An area wedged between the Borough of Metuchen to the south and the Metuchen Golf and Country Club to the north. West of Clive Hills and east of Plainfield Road.	
Oak Tree		40°34′40″N 74°22′36″W	An area of the battlefield of the Oak Tree Engagement, part of the Battle of Short Hills, encompassing about 300 acres (120 ha) was listed on the National Register of Historic Places in 2014 as the Short Hills Battlefield Historic District. Oak Tree Pond Park is used as a reenactment site. Oak Tree Road is a shopping strip that runs through the Oak Tree neighborhood of Edison and neighboring Iselin and is considered the largest and most diverse South Asian cultural hub in the United States.	
Park Forest		40°33′22″N 74°19′43″W	A residential community bordered by Grandview Avenue to the west, the New Jersey Turnpike to the south, US Route 1 to the north and the Woodbridge Township line to the east. The community includes James Monroe Elementary School.	
Park Gate		40°33′50″N 74°23′10″W	A townhouse and condominium private residential community located south of New Petrograd, west of Stephenville, north of Westbrook Corners and east of The Enclave.	
Phoenix		40°31′47″N 74°20′28″W	Located in the eastern part of the township, Phoenix is a just adjacent to Clara Barton south of the Middlesex Greenway and north of Interstate 287. It was considered a neighborhood of Clara Barton. For the community in Sayreville, see Phoenix, Sayreville, New Jersey.	
Piscatawaytown		40°30′06″N 74°23′45″W	This is the oldest neighborhood in Edison. Along with Quibbletown and Raritan Landing Piscatawaytown was an early village in Piscataway. Comprising former sections of Piscataway and Woodbridge townships, Edison was settled (by Europeans) in the 17th century. Piscataway is centered around St. James Church and the Piscatawaytown Common, near the intersection of Plainfield and Woodbridge Avenues.	
Potters		40°35′37″N 74°21′41″W	Site of a historical African American community in the northern part of the township centered around Inman and Grove avenues once known as Potters Corner. The neighborhood was largely razed during an urban renewal project in the early 1970s; it has been replaced by the James D. Elder Park and two low-income housing development projects: Greenwood Townhouses and Colonial Square Townhouses.	
Pumptown	Park Avenue at Plainfield Road	40°33′47″N 74°22′24″W	Originally Pumptown Corners this a residential neighborhood has a suburban population density. Housing is primarily made up of medium-sized to large occupied single-family homes and townhomes. Many of the residences in the Pumptown neighborhood are older and well-established, built between 1940 and 1969. A number of residences were also built between 1970 and 1999.	
Raritan Center	Welcome sign at entrance to Raritan Center	40°31′21″N 74°20′16″W	Sited on part if the former Raritan Arsenal, the Raritan Center Business Park is a 2,300-acre logistics center with office buildings and millions of square feet of light manufacturing or distribution. It provides services for transload, cross-dock, warehousing and "3PL" service providers operations. It is home to regional distribution facilities for world class organizations including FedEx, The Home Depot, Certainteed, Arizona Beverages, among others.	
Raritan Manor		40°32′11″N 74°20′12″W		
Roosevelt Park		40.53833°N 74.37861°W	Roosevelt Park is bounded by Route 1, Parsonage Road, the Reading Railroad, and the AMTRAK Northeast Corridor tracks. It is wedged between Robinvale, Clara Barton, Menlo Park and Woodbridge. It notably includes Roosevelt Park and the Menlo Park Mall, a super regional shopping mall on U.S. Route 1 at Parsonage Road, which was proposed in 1953 and opened in 1959.	
Sand Hills		40°31′30″N 74°19′10″W	Sand Hills is a neighborhood straddling Edison and adjacent Woodbridge. It was considered a neighborhood of Clara Barton.	
Silver Lake		40°29′46″N 74°24′10″W	A small lake of same name borders the neighborhood.	
Stelton		40°30′51″N 74°24′13″W	One of the oldest parts of Edison.	
Stephenville		40°33′57″N 74°22′43″W	Stephenville is a residential community bordered by Park Avenue to the south and west ends and Plainfield Road to the east. Stephenville Parkway, a median strip-street which runs east–west in the center of the community. Stephenville is located between Sutton Hollow to the north, the Oak Tree-Stephenville Park to the northeast, Hampshire Gardens, Chandler Hill, Glenwood Park, Carriage Hill, Woodbrook and Arrowhead Park to the east, Woodbrook Corners to the south, and Park Gate and New Petrograd to the west.	
Sutton Hollow		40°34′27″N 74°22′56″W	Sutton Hollow is a residential community bordered by Park Avenue to the west, Plainfield Road to the east and Oak Tree Road to the north. It is located between Oak Tree to the north, the Oak Tree-Stephenville Park to the east, Stephenville to the south, and New Petrograd to the west.	
Tamarack-at-Oak-Hill		40°33′42″N 74°22′05″W	An area south of Arrowhead Park and Woodcroft, west of the Metuchen Golf and Country Club and north of Oak Hills. The community is centered around Golf Road, Tamarack Road, Sandia Court, Remington Drive and Fielding Place.	
Tamarack North		40°34′07″N 74°21′52″W	An area in north Edison located south of Briarwood East, west of Timber Grove, north of Woodbrook East and east of Arrowhead Park. The community is centered around Huntington Road, George Avenue and Hadfield Road.	
Timber Grove		40°34′11″N 74°21′37″W	Also known as Westergrove. A community located east of Briarwood East and Tamarack North, west of Timbergrove East, and north of Woodcroft East. The community includes the streets Stephenville Parkway, Midland Road, Grove Avenue and Huntington Road.	
Timbergrove East		40°34′06″N 74°21′18″W	A residential community developed in the middle of the 1960s. It is located east of Grove Avenue and south of Oak Tree Road in the western portion of Menlo Park.	
Timbergrove North		40°34′22″N 74°21′32″W	A residential community developed in the middle of the 1970s. It is located west of Grove Avenue and north of Oak Tree Road in the western portion of Menlo Park.	
Valentine	Amboy Avenue in Valentine	40°31′51″N 74°19′32″W	Valentine is adjacent to the Fords section of Woodbridge. It was considered a neighborhood of Clara Barton.	
Valhalla		40°35′52″N 74°23′22″W	Developed in the 1910s and 1920s by the Valhalla Realty Company, Valhalla is centered around Old Raritan Road west of North Edison. It is east of Plainfield Country Club and Hillside Cemetery.	
Vineyard Village		40°31′29″N 74°22′32″W	Adjacent to former Edison Assembly. Edward Antill, a colonial politician, owned large tracts of land (800 acres) in what was then Piscataway, including vineyards.	
Washington Park		40°30′50″N 74°23′54″W	Washington Park is to the east of Stelton.	
Westgate Square		40°35′56″N 74°22′01″W	Westgate Square is 'townhome' condominium development from 1982 in North Edison sited on 66 acres (27 ha) north of Potters at the border with Scotch Plains (Union County). The Ash Brook Reservation lies at the northeastern edge of the community; the Robinsons Branch of the Rahway River and the Lehigh Line (Conrail) at its eastern & southern perimeters.	
Woodbrook Corners		40°33′27″N 74°23′10″W	A residential development built on the former Woodbrook Farms dairy farmland. Located east of Dismal Swamp and the former Perth Amboy Branch rail line, south of Stephenville and Park Gate and west of Woodbrook Elementary School and Woodrow Wilson Middle School.	
Woodcroft East		40°33′54″N 74°21′36″W	Woodcroft East is a residential community bordered by Grove Avenue and Menlo Park to the east, the Metuchen Golf and Country Club to the south, Arrowhead Park to the west and Tamarack North, the Winter Street Park and Timber Grove to the north.	

== See also ==
- Edison State Park
- Dismal Swamp (New Jersey)
- Roosevelt Park (Edison, New Jersey)
- List of neighborhoods in Woodbridge Township, New Jersey
- Neighborhoods in Perth Amboy, New Jersey
- List of neighborhoods in Sayreville, New Jersey
