= Lincoln Park, New Jersey (disambiguation) =

Lincoln Park, New Jersey may refer to:

- Lincoln Park, New Jersey, a borough in Morris County
- Lincoln Park, Edison, New Jersey, a neighborhood in Edison
- Lincoln Park (Jersey City), a park in Jersey City
- Lincoln Park, Newark, New Jersey, a neighborhood in Newark
- Lincoln Park, New Brunswick, New Jersey, a neighborhood in New Brunswick
