= Battle of Punk Hill =

1777 Skirmish in the American Revolutionary War

- Part of the American Revolutionary War
Date	8 March 1777, a Saturday
Location	Bonhamtown, New Jersey 40.523°N 74.357°W
Result	Minor American victory

Belligerents
United States; Pennsylvania militia	Great Britain

Commanders and leaders
Gen. William Maxwell; Col. James Potter and others...	Gen. William Howe and others...

Strength
Unknown number of militia and regulars	3,000 British regulars

Casualties and losses
None	4 killed, 3 captured, unknown wounded

The Battle of Punk Hill was a relatively minor skirmish in the greater Forage War of the American Revolutionary War, but it narrowly missed being a major turning point.

Approximately 3,000 British regulars left Amboy for the Punk Hill area, ostensibly on a foraging expedition. General William Maxwell observed this movement from a nearby hill and sent a small detachment to harass the British on the left and sent a larger force to the right towards Bonhamtown (later to became part of Edison, New Jersey), hoping to outflank them. The larger force consisted of two detachments, one from Col. Potter's Pennsylvania militia and commanded by Col. Cook. the other detachment was from Col. Thacher's New England troops.

Cook's and Thacher's men joined forces approximately one half mile out and almost immediately encountered and engaged a substantial advanced party of British. General Maxwell sent Col. Martin and Lt. Col. Lindley to reinforce them quickly and began to assembling his main force to follow.

The British also sent reinforcements but they were cut off by another regiment of Americans. That British reinforcements retreated in confusion, sparking a general panic among their comrades and turning the entire engagement into a rout. The Americans chased them as far as Bonhamtown and Metuchen, but did not have sufficient numbers or cover to continue the pursuit.

There were at least four British killed and three taken prisoner. One of the prisoners revealed that General Howe had been at Bonhamtown during the engagement. Had Maxwell known this beforehand, the Battle of Punk Hill could have been a pivotal moment in the war.
