= Potters, New Jersey =

Populated place in Middlesex County, New Jersey, US

- Unincorporated community
- Location in Middlesex County, New Jersey Potters (New Jersey) Potters (the United States)
- Coordinates: 40°35′37″N 74°21′41″W
- Country: United States
- State: New Jersey
- County: Middlesex
- Township: Edison
- Elevation: 92 ft (28 m)
- GNIS feature ID: 884389

Potters was an unincorporated community and is now a neighborhood within Edison Township in Middlesex County, in the U.S. state of New Jersey.

In the northern part of the township, Potters was once known as Potters Crossing, and may have been an African-American community as early as the 1800s. Centered around Inman Avenue and Grove Avenue, it is believed that seven upper-middle-class families moved to the village from Harlem in 1917. The community grew in the 1920s, with families from the South. By the 1940s, it had more than 1,500 residents and included three churches and a volunteer fire department.

As early as 1955, Edison was pushing for a federal housing project to eliminate the slum areas of Potters. The community was dispersed during an urban renewal projects in the 1960s and 1970s. It was largely and replaced by the James D. Elder Park and two low-income housing development projects: Greenwood Townhouses and Colonial Square Townhouses. The Mount Pleasant Baptist Church was relocated in 1978.

== See also ==
- List of neighborhoods in Edison, New Jersey
