= Stelton Baptist Church, Edison =

Historic site in Middlesex County, New Jersey, US

Coordinates: 40.517047°N 74.406964°W

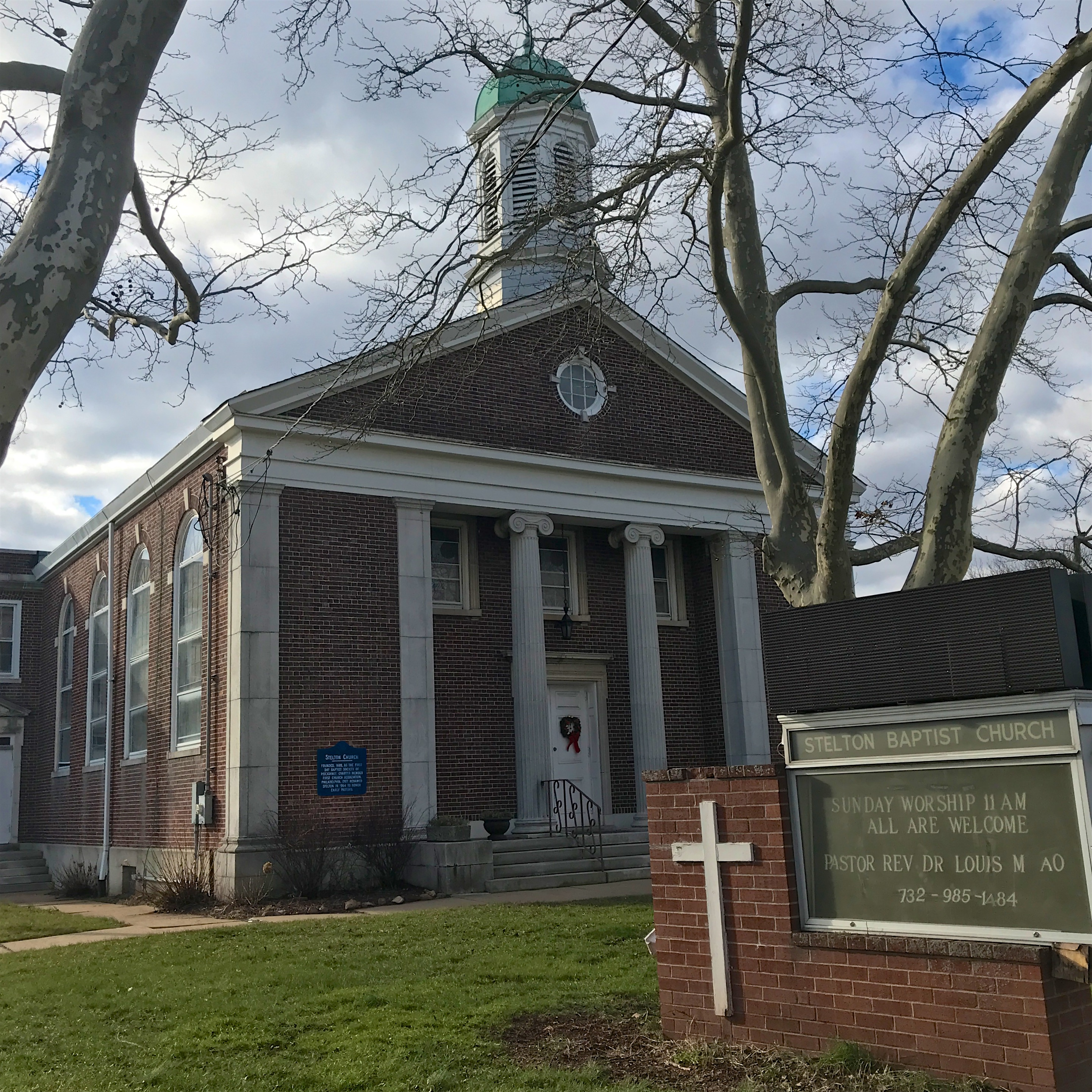
Stelton Baptist Church in 2019

The Stelton Baptist Church is in the Stelton section of Edison, Middlesex County, New Jersey, United States. It is the second oldest Baptist congregation in New Jersey and the tenth oldest in the United States. The current church building is the fourth on the site and was constructed in 1925.

== History ==
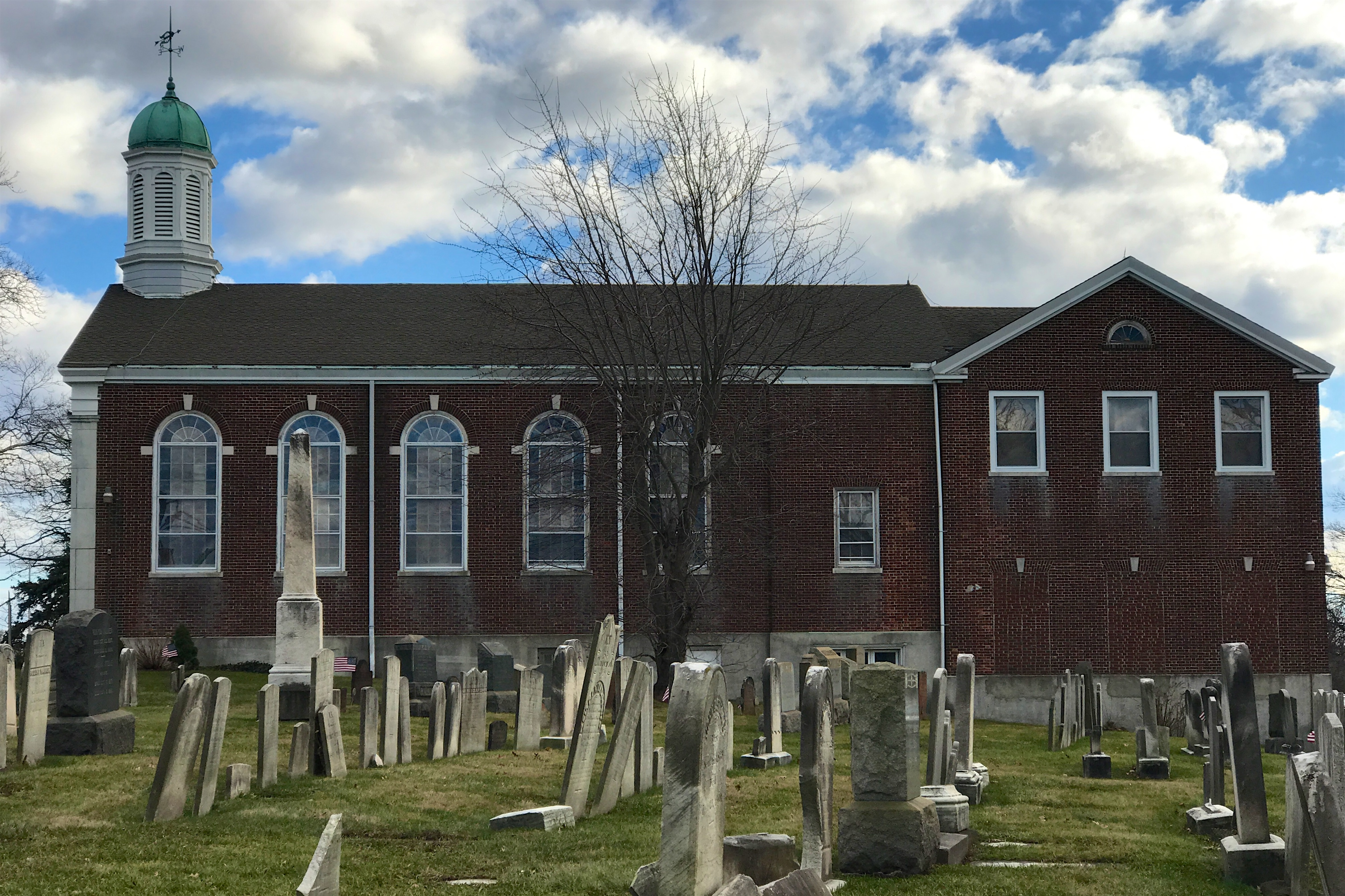
Stelton Baptist Church cemetery

The congregation was formed in spring 1689, and among its original members was the Stelle family, after whom the Stelton section of Edison, New Jersey is named. Until 1875, the church was known as the First Baptist Church of Piscataway, as the site was part of Piscataway until the 1870 formation of Raritan Township, later renamed Edison. The cemetery contains hundreds of early burials, including Andrew Drake.

The land occupied by the church and cemetery at Stelton was purchased in April 1731. The first church building was erected in 1748. It was replaced by a second building in 1825, which was destroyed by a fire on January 1, 1851. The building which took its place was destroyed in a fire in 1924. The present building was erected in 1925.

The first female pastor of the congregation, the Rev. Kathleen Tice, was installed in 1999. After 10 years of service at the congregation, Pastor Tice retired during the summer of 2010.
