= Piscatawaytown, New Jersey =

Populated place in Middlesex County, New Jersey, US

- Unincorporated community
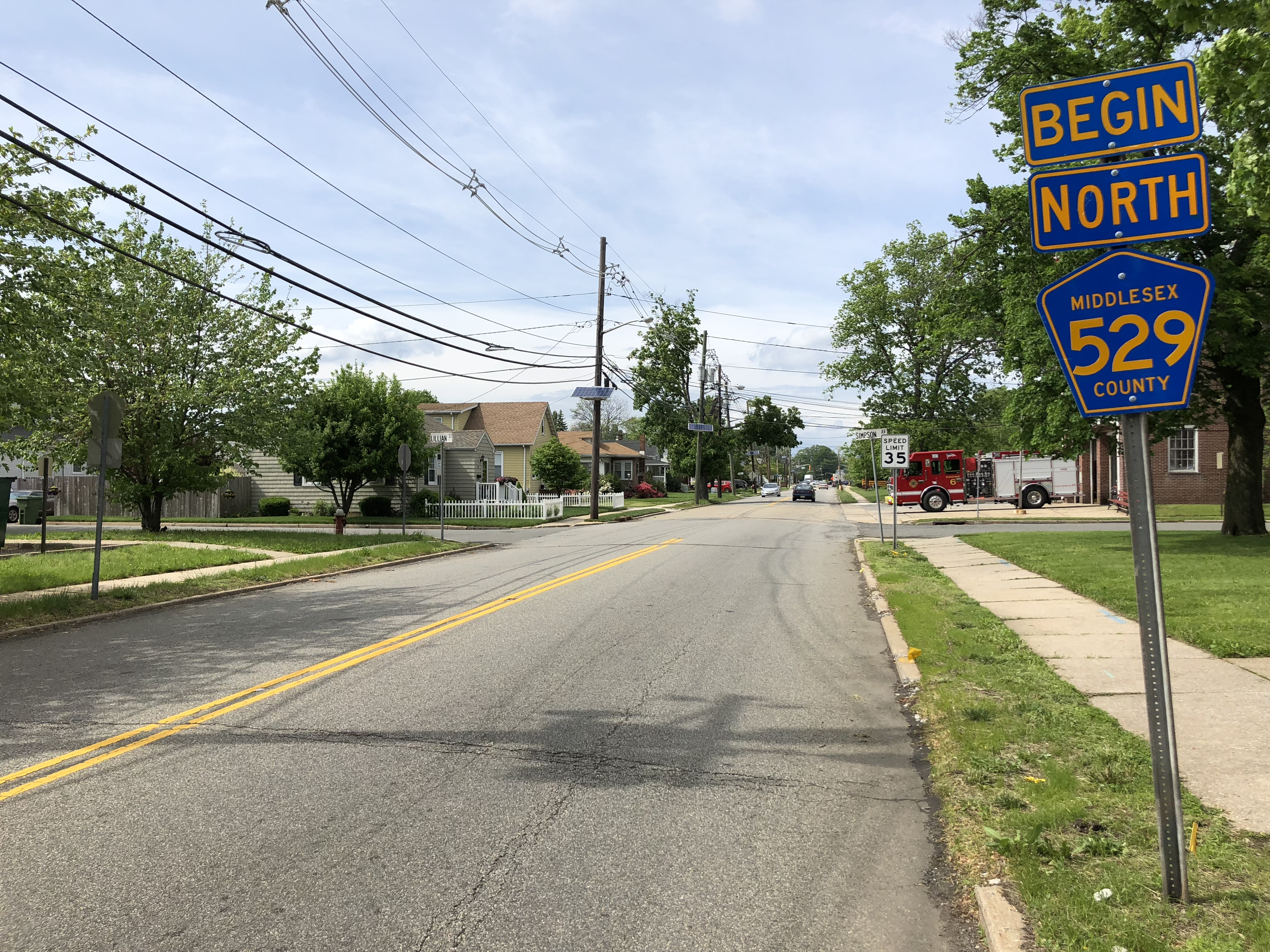
- County Route 529 (Plainfield Avenue) in Piscatawaytown, facing north

- Location in Middlesex County Piscatawaytown (New Jersey) Piscatawaytown (the United States)
- Coordinates: 40°30′06″N 74°23′45″W
- Country: United States
- State: New Jersey
- County: Middlesex
- Township: Edison
- Elevation: 115 ft (35 m)
- GNIS feature ID: 880876

Piscatawaytown is the oldest neighborhood in Edison in Middlesex County, New Jersey. It was established in the 1660s as the original village in what was then within Piscataway. Piscatawaytown is centered around St. James Church, the Piscatawaytown Burial Ground and the Piscatawaytown Common, near the intersection of Plainfield and Woodbridge Avenues.

== Establishment and naming ==
The Raritan were bands of the Lenape people living around the Raritan River and its bay, in what is now central New Jersey and Staten Island, New York.

Piscataway was settled New Englanders in the 17th century. In 1666, the first proprietary Governor of the Province of New Jersey, Philip Carteret, granted 12 new settlers from Massachusetts a 100 square mile allotment of land that was later founded as the townships of Piscataway and Woodbridge. Soon thereafter additional settlers from the Piscataqua River, the state boundary of New Hampshire and Maine moved to region, bringing the name. Other settlements included Quibbletown and Raritan Landing.

== Municipal boundaries ==
On March 17, 1870, portions of adjacent Piscataway and Woodbridge were used to form Raritan Township. Raritan Township was renamed Edison in the 1950s.

== Historic area ==
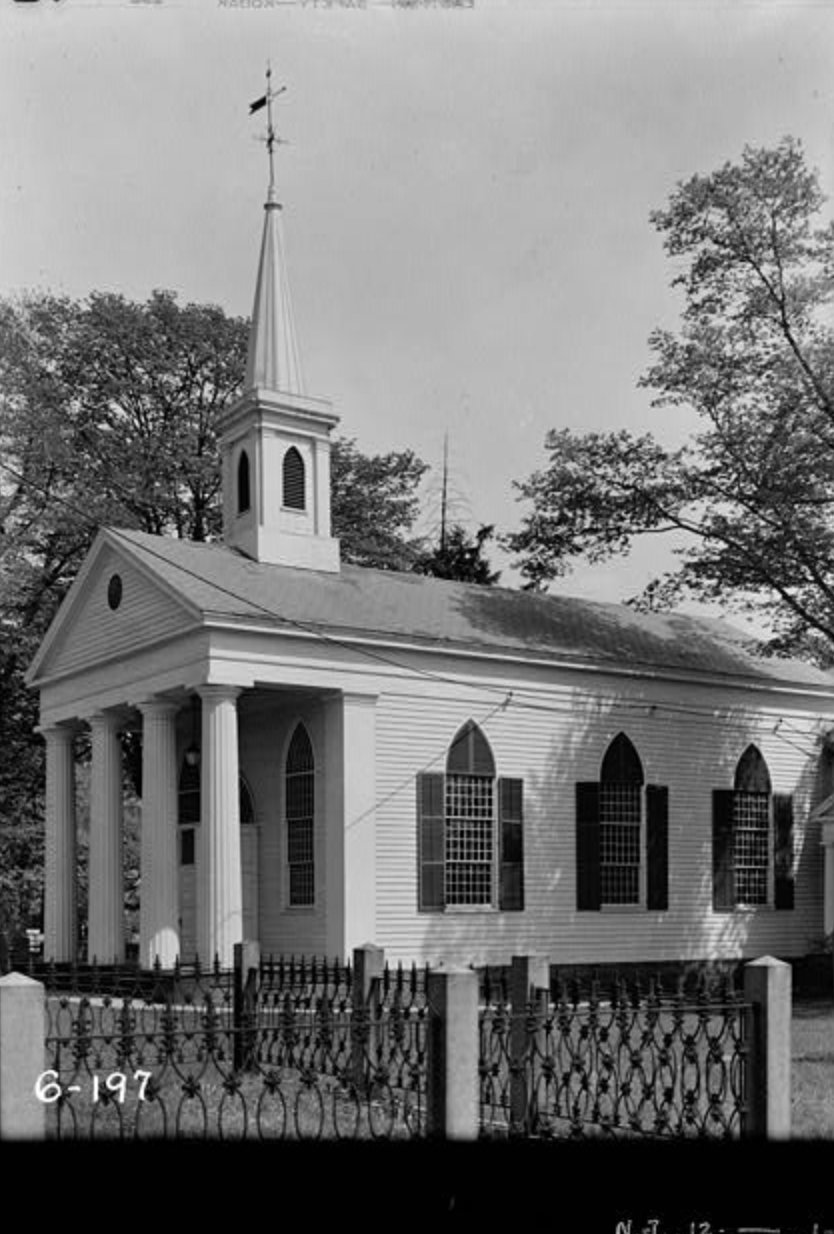
St. James Episcopal Church

The Proprietors of the Province of East New Jersey granted a tract of land for a burial ground and a town common on March 5, 1695. The settlement comprised a town hall, militia training ground, stockade, jail, church, burial ground and houses. Saint James Church was established in 1704 and the original structure built in 1724. The existing building is from 1836.

Considerable military activity and battles known as the Forage War took place during the Revolutionary War in the Piscatawaytown area in 1776 and 1777. The Post Road (a post road, now Woodbridge Avenue) was a main land artery for British communications and movement of supplies and troops. The British army used St. James Church as a barracks and a hospital from December 1776 to June 1777.

A June 1835 tornado caused damage to many of the gravestones as well as Saint James Church.

=== Burial ground ===
The Piscatawaytown Burial Ground is one of the oldest recorded cemeteries in Middlesex County and maintained by the township.

There had been burials at the location before the granting of tract, with one readable gravestone dating from 1693. The oldest readable gravestone is that of the Hoopar brothers, aged 10 and 12, who died of mushroom poisoning. The brothers were buried in 1693.

There are many veterans from various wars buried in the grounds. This includes British soldiers who had died in the Revolutionary War and were buried in a common grave in 1777 . The highest ranking veteran buried in the grounds is Brevet Major General Thomas Swords, a veteran of the Mexican War and Civil War, buried in 1886.

A ground-penetrating radar scan of the burial ground conducted in 2021 identified 98 graves in the southwest corner of the grounds which has been designated as the colored burial ground. Only 11 of those individuals have been identified. In total, there have been 1,815 burials identified as of 2015, with 1,494 of those burials having gravestones.

== See also ==
- List of neighborhoods in Edison, New Jersey
