= Pumptown, New Jersey =

Populated place in Middlesex County, New Jersey, US

- Unincorporated community
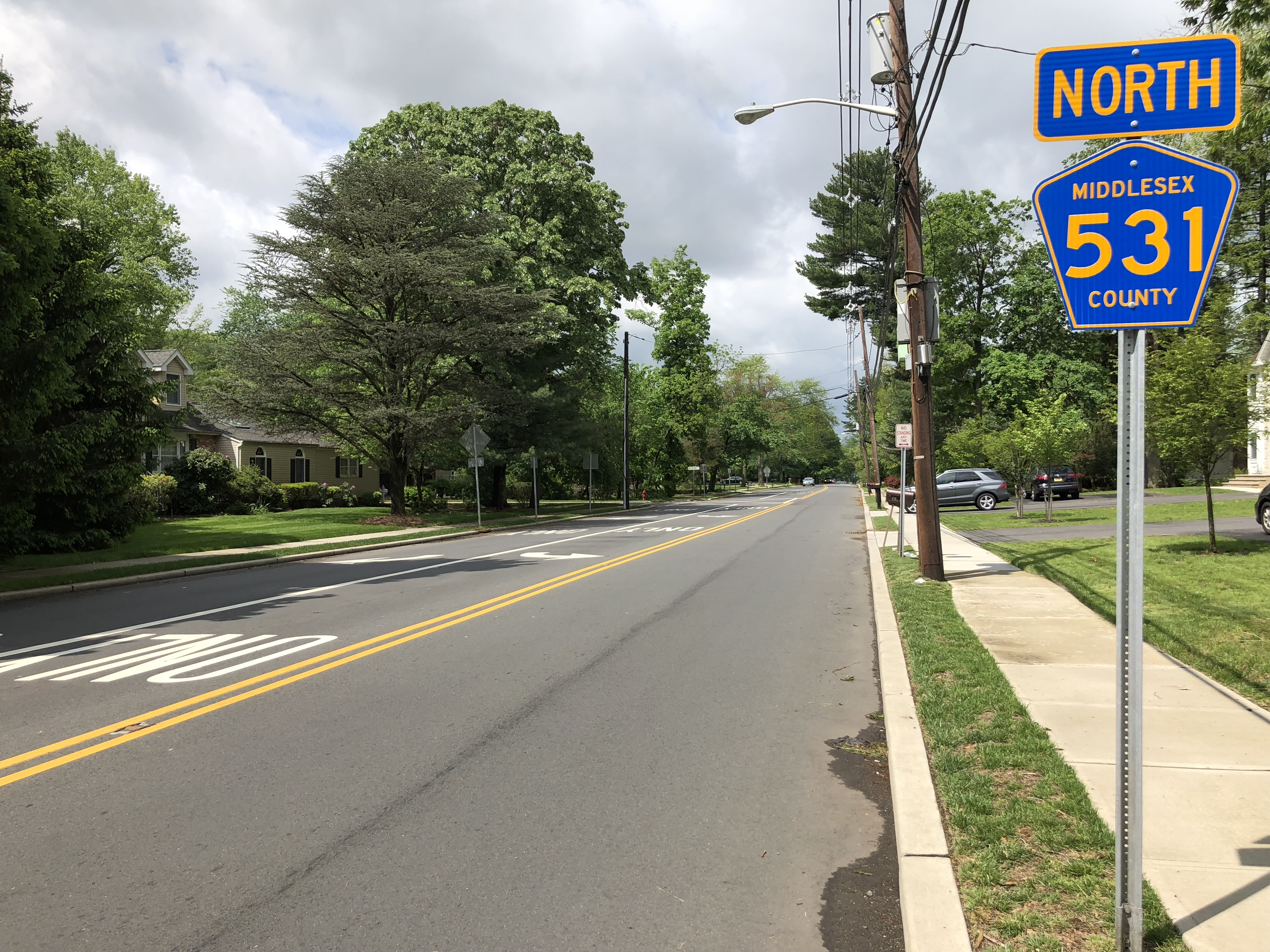
- Park Avenue and Plainfield Road (CR 529) in Pumptown

- Location of Pumptown in Middlesex County Inset: Location of county within the state of New Jersey Pumptown (New Jersey) Pumptown (the United States)
- Coordinates: 40°33′47″N 74°22′24″W
- Country: United States
- State: New Jersey
- County: Middlesex
- Township: Edison
- Elevation: 108 ft (33 m)
- GNIS feature ID: 879554

Pumptown (also known as Pumptown Corners) is an unincorporated community located within Edison Township in Middlesex County, in the U.S. state of New Jersey.

Pumptown is named after a public pump that stood in the middle of the intersection of Park Ave. and Plainfield Rd.

It is a suburban neighborhood (based on population density), its real estate primarily made up of medium-sized (three- or four-bedroom) to large (four- or more bedroom) single-family homes and townhomes. Most of the residential real estate is owner-occupied. Many are older, well-established, built between 1940 and 1969. A number of residences were also built between 1970 and 1999.

== See also ==
- List of neighborhoods in Edison, New Jersey
