= Dismal Swamp (New Jersey) =

Protected area in New Jersey, US

Coordinates: 40.54743°N 74.374492°W

- Interactive map of Dismal Swamp
- Location: Middlesex County, New Jersey
- Area: 650 acres (3 km^{2})

The Dismal Swamp is a marshy area in Middlesex County in central New Jersey. The marshes border the towns of Edison, South Plainfield, and Metuchen.

The Dismal Swamp is a wetland ecosystem located in an urban environment. The swamp covers nearly 650 acres (3 km^{2}) with 12 acres (0 km^{2}) located in Metuchen with the remaining portion in Edison and South Plainfield. The swamp contains a number of wildlife species, including the endangered loggerhead shrike. There are an estimated 165 different species of birds in the swamp.

== History ==
The swamp's geology is part of the Passaic Formation and consists of sedimentary rock composed of red-brown shale.

Relics found in the swamp, believed to be from prehistoric times, include stone axes, spear heads, and arrow points indicating that the swamp was inhabited by early man.

It was known to the Lenape as Maniquescake.

A vineyard was planted in the southern section of the swamp during the 1700s with subsequent agriculture development during the 1800s.

In the early 1900s a Russian exile settlement, New Petrograd, was established near the swamp near the Metuchen border.

It is believed that the name of the swamp comes from Dismal Brook, a stream that once flowed through the area.

The Triple C Ranch, located within Dismal Swamp, is headquarters to the Edison Wetlands Association. Located in the middle of the Swamp, and adjacent to 275 acres (1 km^{2}) of land owned by Edison Township, the 5.27 acres (0 km^{2}) ranch is one of the few remaining working farms in northern Middlesex County.

The Middlesex Greenway, a rail-trail, provides public access to some sections of the swamp.
