= Gustav Lindenthal =

American civil engineer

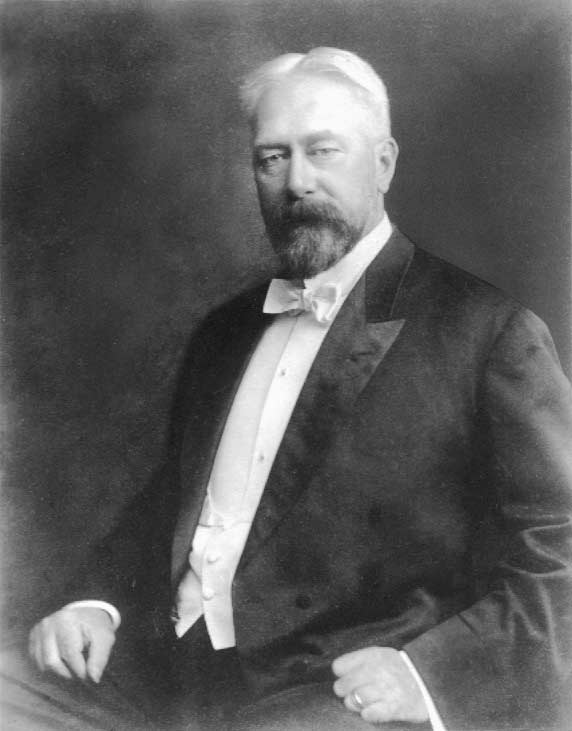
- Lindenthal in 1909
- Born: May 21, 1850; Brno, Austrian Empire (Present-day, Brno, Czech Republic)
- Died: July 31, 1935 (aged 85); Metuchen, New Jersey, U.S.
- Occupation: Civil engineer
- Known for: Hell Gate Bridge

Gustav Lindenthal (May 21, 1850 – July 31, 1935) was a civil engineer who designed the Queensboro and Hell Gate bridges in New York City, among other bridges. Lindenthal's work was greatly affected by his pursuit for perfection and his love of art. Having received little formal education and no degree in civil engineering, Lindenthal based his work on his prior experience and techniques used by other engineers of the time.

== Early life ==
Lindenthal was born in Brünn, Austrian Empire, now Brno, Czech Republic in 1850. Lindenthal began to receive practical training in 1866 when he was employed as a mason and carpenter. At the age of 18, Lindenthal left his family to set out to make a life of his own in Vienna, Austria.

== Career ==
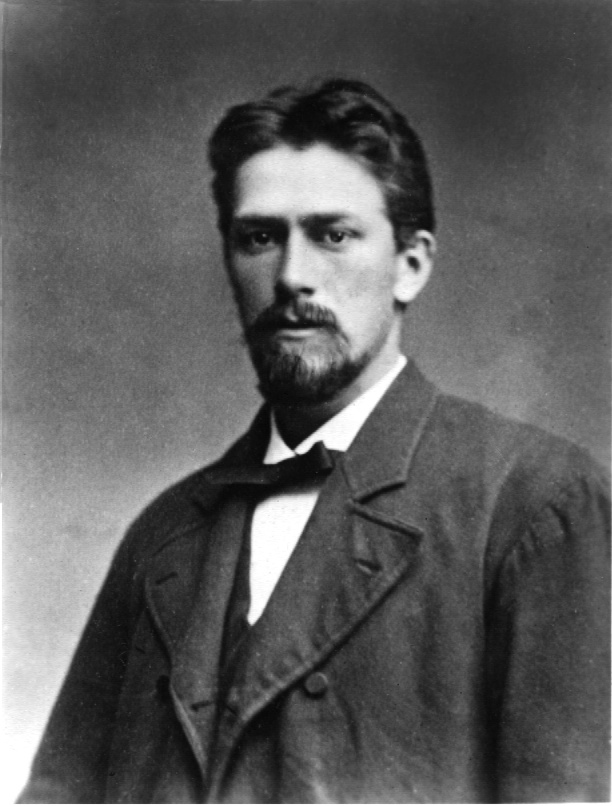
Lindenthal in 1880

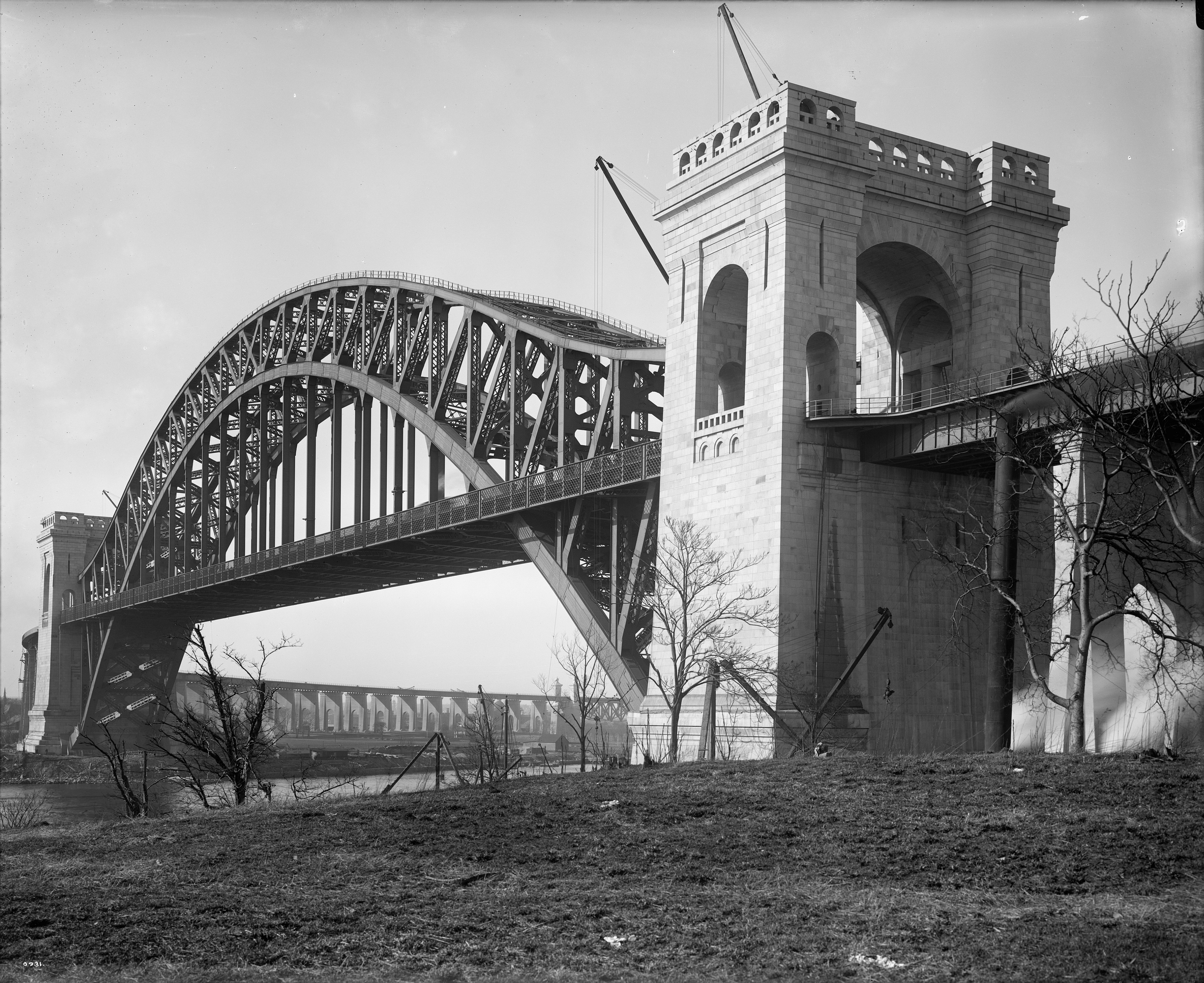
The Hell Gate Bridge c. 1917

When he arrived in Vienna he became an assistant in the engineering department for the Empress Elisabeth Railway of Austria. Two years later he joined the Union Construction Company, where he gained experience in building incline planes and railroads. Then a year later he decided to join the Swiss Federal Railways, where he was hired on as a division engineer in charge of location and construction. While living in Vienna, he attended some public engineering lectures at a local university. However, he never did actually attend the university or receive a degree. Lindenthal in fact taught himself mathematics, engineering theory, metallurgy, hydraulics, estimating, management, and everything else that a successful bridge engineer needed to know. Nevertheless, the lack of his formal education hindered him from further advancement in Europe, so he decided to emigrate to the United States in 1874.

When he first arrived in the United States he was employed as a journeyman stonemason for the memorial granite building of the Centennial International Exhibition in Philadelphia in 1876. After completion of this project, Lindenthal worked for the Keystone Bridge Company of Pittsburgh, Pennsylvania, on numerous projects over a three-year period. While working for this company, he gained valuable experience which propelled him to the status of bridge engineer. He worked for the Atlantic and Great Western Railroad during 1879 to 1881.

In 1881, Lindenthal established his own consulting business and built four bridges in the Pittsburgh area: 30th Street Bridge (Herrs Island); Smithfield Street Bridge (over the Monongahela River; 1883), Youghiogheny River Bridge at McKeesport (1883); and the Seventh Street Bridge (Allegheny River; 1884). In 1884, he founded the North River Bridge Company in New York, with the intent of building a massive bridge over the Hudson River for the Pennsylvania Railroad (PRR). Although the PRR ultimately decided to build tunnels under the river rather than a bridge, the two companies continued their relationship. The PRR hired Lindenthal in 1904 to work on the New York Connecting Railroad and lead the Hell Gate Bridge project. The completed bridge was dedicated by Lindenthal and the PRR on March 9, 1917.

Lindenthal's career transitioned to public service when he was appointed to lead the New York City Department of Bridges from 1902 through 1903. As Commissioner of Bridges, he managed several projects spanning the East River, and had a major role in designing the Queensboro Bridge and Hell Gate Bridge. In one of the more novel initiatives of his tenure, Lindenthal advocated for the construction of continuous "moving platform" transit systems in lieu of traditional subway trains on the Brooklyn Bridge and Williamsburg Bridge. While the proposals ultimately remained unbuilt, the city would eventually host a similar (albeit scaled-down) concept sixty years later with the Ford Motor Company "Magic Skyway" attraction at the 1964 New York World's Fair.

The North River Bridge Company developed another proposal for a large Hudson River suspension bridge in 1920. This design would have been built at 57th Street in Manhattan, to carry both roadway and railroads, but neither the city nor the railroads were supportive. (Lindenthal's colleague Othmar Ammann developed a scaled-down bridge proposal several years later, which became the George Washington Bridge, completed in 1931.) Lindenthal worked on several other bridge projects around the country in the 1920s. Perhaps his most famous and lasting achievement outside of New York is the Sciotoville Bridge, a rail crossing of the Ohio River, completed about the same time as the Hell Gate Bridge.

Lindenthal had a difference in opinion with one of the standard engineering practices of the day. Prior to the automobile, train construction represented the majority of transport building that took place. Trains being as heavy as they were made engineers greatly overcompensate and build bridges that were oversized, bulky, and expensive. Lindenthal pointed out that bridges did not have to support the full load of a train as a single point load. Instead, a train moves across the bridge and displaces its load relatively evenly. This was not how the bridges were tested to see if a design worked though. The train's total dead weight was simply added to the bridge, and if it did not hold, it was said to be structurally unstable. Lindenthal's idea of not having to carry the full load allowed bridge designers to create bridges that were still stable, but at the same time much lighter and cheaper.

Gustav Lindenthal made bridges that reached new heights for his time. At the time of Hell Gate's completion, it stood as the longest and heaviest steel bridge in the world. Gustav Lindenthal also expanded the idea of "double decker" lanes on his bridges. The Queensboro Bridge is one of the bridges Lindenthal designed that displays the double decker idea.

=== Construction techniques ===
During the time Lindenthal practiced engineering, the railroad industry was expanding and replacing many wooden-truss bridges with stronger ones capable of handling the heavier locomotive loads. In order to accommodate these heavier trains, different construction materials were being utilized. The materials being considered by engineers like Lindenthal were reinforced concrete, cable, and steel. Steel and reinforced concrete were two main materials used in the truss bridges Lindenthal designed. The use of reinforced concrete was a relatively new idea in bridge construction, with its first use in 1889.

The design of the Hell Gate Bridge required a different approach to bridge construction. Nearly all major members of Hell Gate are composed of smaller trusses. The erection of the Hell Gate was carried through without the assistance of any falsework, or work that was not part of the actual bridge. This was accomplished by building the two halves of the arch simultaneously from each tower. The steel work was supported with the use of cables during construction to carry the load of the arches until they finally met at the center of the span.

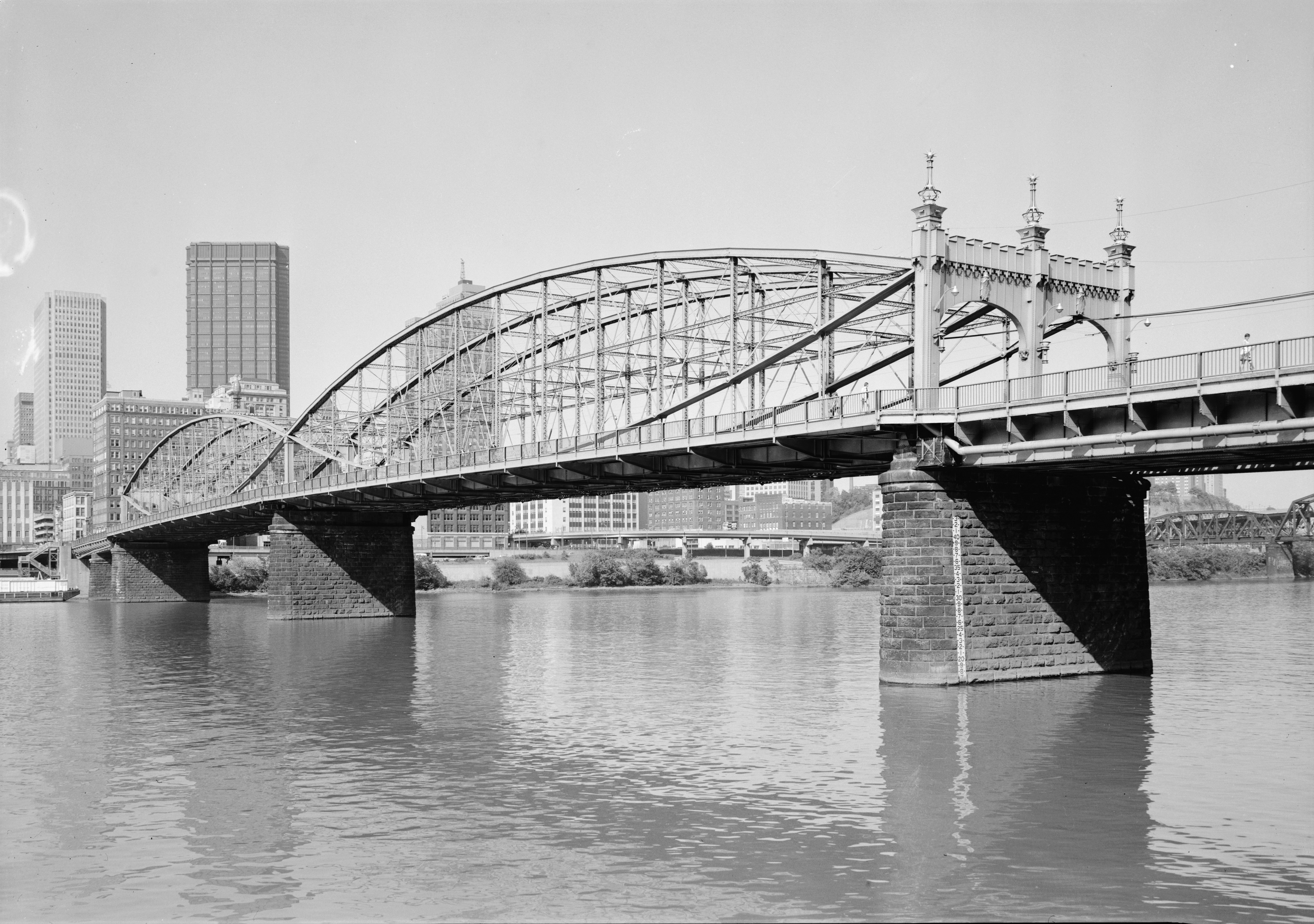
Smithfield Street Bridge in 1974

In another instance, a bridge needed to be constructed over the Monongahela River, after the ferry, which was used for many years beforehand, became outdated. The first bridge, designed by John Roebling, continuously swayed and deflected, and was being "shaky and loose." Lindenthal was given an opportunity to design a replacement, the Smithfield Street Bridge in Pittsburgh. This bridge, completed in 1883 using the structural form of a lenticular truss, could withstand higher stresses, as well as using resources that made it more economical (Approximately $23,000 was saved simply by using these materials). "Lindenthal's use of steel instead of iron wherever possible was based upon economy as much as anything."

== Personal life ==
At the age of eighty-five, Lindenthal succumbed to a long illness and died shortly after, at his home in Metuchen, New Jersey. Lindenthal's Metuchen property extended northward towards Oak Tree Road into Raritan Township (present-day Edison, New Jersey), and was later bought by contractor Frank P. Tufaro for the development of the Stephenville community. Up until that point, he remained active as president and chief engineer of the North River Bridge Company.

== Gustav Lindenthal Medal ==
The International Bridge Conference is the site of the annual presentation of the Gustav Lindenthal Medal. Winners have included the Millau Viaduct, the Deh Cho Bridge and the Juscelino Kubitschek Bridge.
