= Stelton, New Jersey =

Populated place in Middlesex County, New Jersey, US

- Unincorporated community
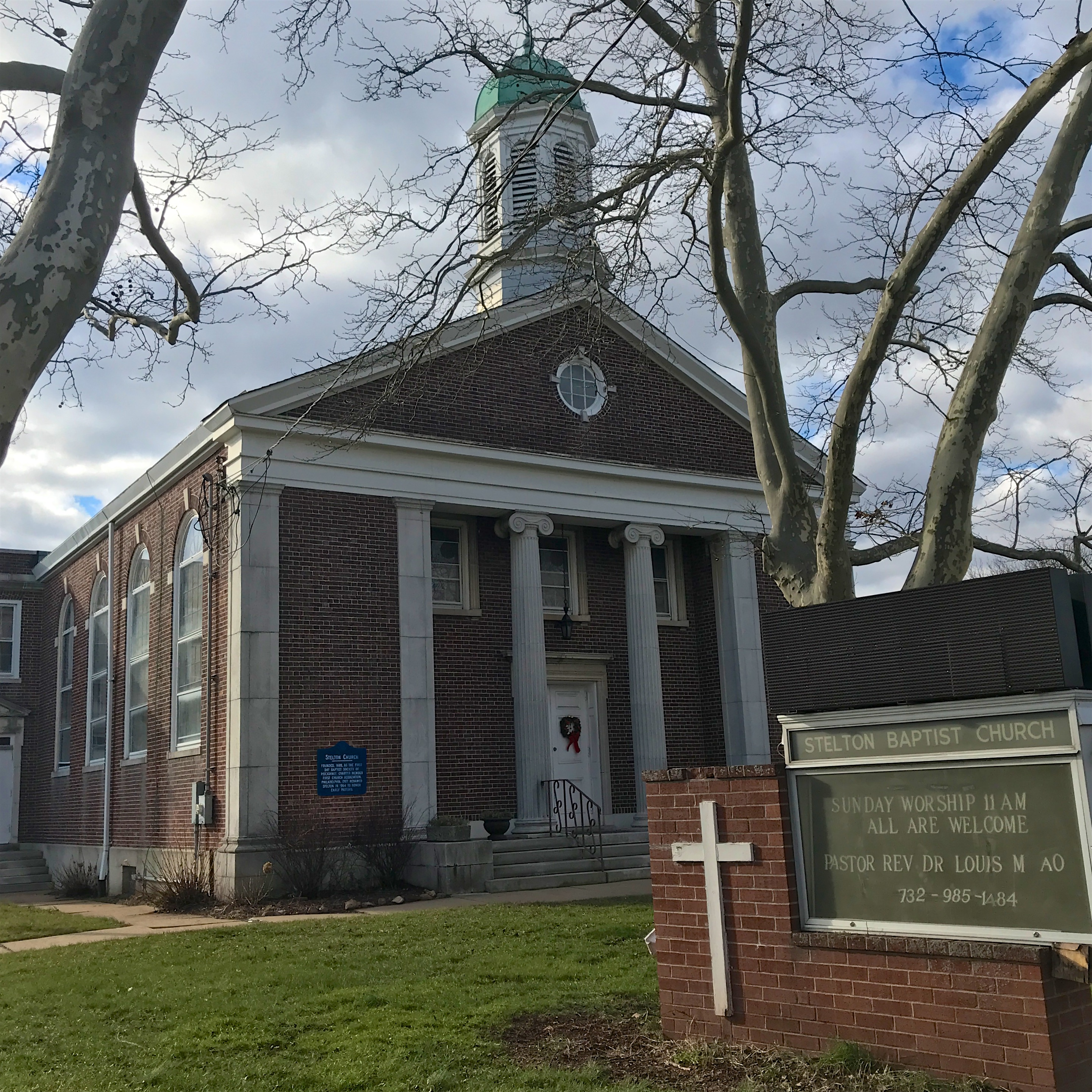
- Stelton Baptist Church

- Location of Stelton in Middlesex County Inset: Location of county within the state of New Jersey Stelton (New Jersey) Stelton (the United States)
- Coordinates: 40°30′51″N 74°24′13″W
- Country: United States
- State: New Jersey
- County: Middlesex
- Township: Edison
- Elevation: 115 ft (35 m)
- GNIS feature ID: 880876

Stelton is an unincorporated community located within Edison Township in Middlesex County, in the U.S. state of New Jersey.

Established in 1689, the Stelton Baptist Church is the state's second-oldest baptist congregation.

The present-day NJ Transit Edison station was originally constructed c. 1870 at Central Avenue and Plainfield Avenue and named “Stelton” after the Stelle family, early settlers in Piscatawaytown who arrived in 1668 and who were still numerous in the area in the 1880s. The Pennsylvania Railroad renamed the station to Edison on October 29, 1956, as part of the changing of names in Edison to reflect the newly honored Thomas Alva Edison. Stelton was home to an anarchist school and colony in the Ferrer school of thought for most of the first half of the 20th century.

== See also ==
- List of neighborhoods in Edison, New Jersey
- North Stelton, New Jersey – section in Piscataway
