= Harvard Student Agencies =

Harvard Student Agencies, Inc.
- Type: 501(c)(3) Nonprofit
- Founded: Harvard University, 1957
- Headquarters: Cambridge, Massachusetts, United States
- Subsidiaries: Let's Go; The Harvard Shop
- Website: www.hsa.net

Harvard Student Agencies, Inc. (HSA) is the largest student-run company in the world, employing more than 900 Harvard undergraduates each year, and paying more than $2M in student wages annually. Founded in 1957, HSA is a multimillion-dollar corporation that provides Harvard University students with meaningful opportunities for employment and hands-on business education. Its mission is "to educate, empower, and inspire Harvard College students with meaningful employment opportunities and hands-on business experience." Student managers lead all aspects of the operations and strategy behind HSA's 10 businesses, which range from tutoring to retail, to tours, including HSA Cleaners & Dorm Essentials (a laundry and dorm products service), and The Harvard Shop (a storefront and web retail business).

HSA is a 501(c)(3) nonprofit and was founded to help defray rising tuition costs while providing practical business experience for Harvard undergraduates and supplying services to the campus community.

HSA is headquartered in Cambridge, Massachusetts.

== History ==
=== Founding ===
HSA was founded in 1957 on the ideal of financing education through student employment. With Harvard's tuition on the rise, members of the Financial Aid Office were concerned that the increased cost of higher education would adversely affect the social and economic make-up of those applying to Harvard. At the same time, some ambitious students were running small-scale businesses out of their dorm rooms. John Munro, Dean of Financial Aid, assigned Dustin M. Burke, Director of Student Employment, to investigate student businesses as a possible source of financial aid and to begin developing the idea that would become Harvard Student Agencies.

Later that spring, a meeting with student managers revealed considerable interest in the idea of a corporation, and more concrete plans began to emerge. With an initial capital investment of $7,000 and the acquisition of the rights to provide the weekly linen service traditionally offered by the university, HSA was equipped to carry its corporate overhead. The remaining pieces quickly fell into place. In August 1957, the papers authorizing a new company were filed. On September 10, the new corporation's first meeting was held. On December 13, 1957, the charter was signed recognizing the six original incorporators: John Munro, Dustin Burke, Greg Stone, John Giannetti, Theodore Elliot, and Harold Rosenwald.

Since then, the company has grown significantly over the past six decades. Let's Go publishing was the leading agency for much of the 1980s and 1990s, at one point publishing more than 50 titles annually. With the recent decline in publishing travel, however, The Harvard Shop has become the largest operation for the Harvard Student Agencies. With a robust e-commerce presence as well as four physical locations in the square, it aims to serve tourists, locals, and students alike. The company has also expanded organically and through acquiring startups that align with the company's mission.

In September 2021, HSA acquired Trademark Tours, the business known for its flagship “Hahvahd Tour.” Trademark Tours was founded in 2006 by then-Harvard-undergraduate Daniel Bodt, who owned and ran the business up to the acquisition.

== HSA Headquarters: Burke-McCoy Hall ==
HSA Headquarters is located at 67 Mount Auburn Street, Cambridge MA, in the former Manter Hall School building which was built in 1927. Established in 1884, Manter Hall School helped students prepare for Harvard's entrance exams during the 1930s and offered four- and eight-hour review sessions before every major Harvard mid-term and final examination. Although enrollment reached a peak of 250 in the late 1940s, by 1994 only 19 students were registered. At this time, Robert Hall, the owner of the building and manager of the school for 57 years, turned 83 and began talking to Harvard Student Agencies. Mr. Hall came to understand the unique educational opportunities HSA afforded to students and decided to sell the property to HSA in the spring of 1994.

In the summer of 1995, Robert W. McCoy (Harvard College ‘62, Harvard Business School ‘65) pledged a substantial lead gift to HSA's capital campaign. The building was dedicated as Burke-McCoy Hall on February 5, 1997, and the dream of a permanent home for HSA was a reality. The building was named in honor of Dustin M. Burke, the first General Manager of HSA (1957-1970); Hester Bell McCoy, who joined HSA in 1961 as the company's secretary; and Robert McCoy, Manager of Europe-by-Car, Assistant General Manager to Dusty Burke, and Let's Go business manager upon his graduation from business school.

HSA currently occupies the top three floors and basement of Burke-McCoy Hall. Bank of America, Playa Bowls, and HSA Cleaners occupy the retail level of Burke-McCoy Hall. Behind the building, enough space exists to accommodate construction of a substantial annex for future expansion. A partnership with CS50, the introductory computer science course with one of the largest enrollments at Harvard, has opened the fourth floor to hosting office hours for students and teaching fellows to meet and congregate. This additional option was created in response to increasing demand for office hours as a result of the size of the course, as well the offer more flexible office hours to fit the wide range of schedules from students taking the class. The partnership also seeks to give students the option to pursue projects related services for students, with room for collaboration with Harvard Student Agencies beyond the one semester course.

HSA also has four locations of The Harvard Shop in Harvard Square at 52 JFK Street, 65 Mt. Auburn Street, 34 JFK Street, and 1350 Mass Ave.

== Notable alumni ==
Because Harvard Student Agencies employees are all students when working for the company, many of its alumni have gone on to distinguished careers in various sectors.

- Bill Ackman, investor
- Larry Cheng, co-founder and managing partner at Volition Capital
- Michael Cohrs, financier, Fellow of Cambridge University
- Michael F. Cronin, businessman, co-founder of Weston Presidio
- Chip Filson, co-founder and chairman of Callahan & Associates
- Jonathan Grayer, former chairman and CEO of Kaplan, Inc.
- Dame Vivian Hunt, managing partner for McKinsey & Company in the United Kingdom
- Ron Kind, Wisconsin congressman
- Oliver Koppell, New York politician
- Thomas Lauderdale, musician
- Herminio Llevat, chairman and former CEO of Flippin' Pizza
- Ghen Maynard, television producer, former network executive, and poker player
- Glen Meakem, entrepreneur and radio host
- Caleb Merkl, co-founder and CEO of Maple
- Deval Patrick, politician, civil rights lawyer, former Massachusetts governor
- Ken Powell, CEO of General Mills
- Charles D. Ravenel, South Carolina politician
- Tweed Roosevelt, great-grandson of President Theodore Roosevelt
- Matt Salzberg, co-founder and CEO of Blue Apron
- Tod Sedgwick, former U.S. ambassador to Slovakia
- Arthur I. Segel, professor at Harvard Business School
- Andrea Silbert, businesswoman, co-founder and former CEO of the Center for Women & Enterprise
- Tracy K. Smith, U.S. poet laureate
- Thomas G. Stemberg, businessman and venture capitalist, co-founder of Staples Inc.
- Gabrielle Thomas, Olympic silver medalist
- Andrew Tobias, columnist, author, and DNC treasurer
- Catherine Turco, professor at MIT Sloan School of Management
- Kevin Young, poet and director of the National Museum of African American History and Culture
