= J. P. Stevens High School =

High school in Middlesex County, New Jersey, US

John P. Stevens High School

Location
- 855 Grove Avenue; Edison, Middlesex County, New Jersey 08820; United States; 40.580924°N 74.359303°W

Information
- Type: Public high school
- Established: 1964
- NCES School ID: 340450003326
- Principal: Fay Kim
- Faculty: 167.8 FTEs
- Grades: 9-12
- Enrollment: 2,687 (as of 2024–25)
- Student to teacher ratio: 16.0:1
- Colors: Dartmouth Green and Old Gold
- Athletics conference: Greater Middlesex Conference (general); Big Central Football Conference (football)
- Team name: Hawks
- Accreditation: Middle States Association of Colleges and Schools
- Newspaper: Hawkeye
- Yearbook: Regalis
- Website: jps.edison.k12.nj.us

John P. Stevens High School (abbr. JP or JPS or JP High) is a four-year comprehensive public high school that serves students in ninth through twelfth grades from the northern end of Edison, in Middlesex County, in the U.S. state of New Jersey. It is one of two high schools in the Edison Township Public Schools District, the other being Edison High School. The school has been accredited by the Middle States Association of Colleges and Schools Commission on Elementary and Secondary Schools since 1969 and is accredited through July 2029.

As of the 2024–25 school year, the school had an enrollment of 2,687 students and 167.8 classroom teachers (on an FTE basis), for a student–teacher ratio of 16.0:1. There were 369 students (13.7% of enrollment) eligible for free lunch and 62 (2.3% of students) eligible for reduced-cost lunch. Based on 2021-22 data from the New Jersey Department of Education, it was the seventh-largest high school in the state and one of 29 schools with more than 2,000 students.

== History ==
John P. Stevens High School was named after New Jersey textile giant John Peters Stevens Jr., who had served nearly two decades on the district's board of education, from 1940 to 1959, and was involved in an extensive range of civic, educational and philanthropic activities. Stevens served as President of J.P. Stevens & Co., a textile firm founded in 1813 that was one of the nation's largest. To avoid being confused with a junior high school, the postnominal "Jr." was omitted from the school's name. Constructed at a cost of $2.7 million (equivalent to $28.0 million in 2025), the new high school opened in September 1964 with 33 classrooms designed for an enrollment of 1,000, though delays in construction meant that the auditorium and other special classrooms weren't complete.

== School structure ==
=== Students ===
The population of J.P. Stevens High School enters primarily from Woodrow Wilson Middle School and John Adams Middle School.

In the 2009–10 school year, on the Language Arts section of the High School Proficiency Assessment (HSPA), 53.1% of students scored proficient and 39.8% scored advanced. On the Math section of the test, 34.5% scored proficient and 54.1% scored advanced. The average SAT score was 1741 out of 2400. The Advanced Placement (AP) participation rate is 37.3%. The average attendance rate is 96.8%. The school had a suspension rate of 10%. 98.9% of JPS seniors graduated. 80% of the graduating seniors planned to go on to four-year colleges and another 16.9% of the graduating seniors expected to go on to two-year colleges.

=== Faculty ===
The faculty population of J.P. Stevens High School in 2022 is around 185 teachers, 5 administrators, 10 counselors, 2 college counselors, PATH Counselors, and a special services team. The student to faculty ratio is 13 to 1. The average faculty member gets paid $55,035 a year while the state average was $52,563.

== Curriculum ==
For the 2021–22 school year, J.P. Stevens offered 32 Advanced Placement (AP) courses. Of its students, 59.8% took at least one AP exam, and 79.4% of test-takers earned a score of 3 or higher.

Language options include Latin, French, Spanish, Hindi, Mandarin Chinese, and Italian. Students must also take health and physical education. Since the Class of 2008, graduation requirements have included coursework in financial literacy and the visual and performing arts. The school offers honors, college-preparatory, and Advanced Placement courses.

== Extracurricular activities ==
=== Athletics ===
The J.P. Stevens High School Hawks compete in the Red Division of the Greater Middlesex Conference, which operates under the supervision of the New Jersey State Interscholastic Athletic Association (NJSIAA). With 1,849 students in grades 10–12, the school was classified by the NJSIAA for the 2019–20 school year as Group IV for most athletic competition purposes, which included schools with an enrollment of 1,060 to 5,049 students in that grade range. The football team competes in Division 5D of the Big Central Football Conference, which includes 60 public and private high schools in Hunterdon, Middlesex, Somerset, Union and Warren counties, which are broken down into 10 divisions by size and location. The school was classified by the NJSIAA as Group V North for football for 2024–2026, which included schools with 1,317 to 5,409 students.

The school participates together with Metuchen High School in a joint ice hockey team in which Edison High School is the host school / lead agency. The co-op program operates under agreements scheduled to expire at the end of the 2023–24 school year.

Interscholastic sports offered include:

- Track
- Cross-country
- Baseball
- Basketball
- Softball
- Soccer
- Lacrosse
- Volleyball
- Weightlifting
- Swim Team
- Football
- Wrestling
- Ski
- Cheerleading
- Tennis
- Ice Hockey
- Bowling
- Golf

- The football team won the Central Jersey Group IV state sectional title in 1977, 1978, 1982, 1984, 1985 and 2001.
- The softball team won the Group IV state championship, defeating runner-up Clifton High School by a score of 4–0 in the tournament finals.
- The boys' wrestling team won the North II Group IV state sectional championship in 2004.

=== Model United Nations ===
The Model United Nations club, JPSMUN, has ranked among the top 10 high school teams in the United States and has been the only public high school on the list. Its awards include:

- Best Large Delegation:
  - HMUN (2012)
  - RUMUN (2016)
  - ILMUNC (2022)
- Outstanding Large Delegation:
  - WAMUNC and VAMUNC (2017)
  - ILMUNC (2018)
  - NAIMUN (2022)

=== Quiz Bowl ===
The Quiz Bowl team, STARS (now JPS Quiz Bowl) has been successful. The team has made Top 16 of 68 in the Bridgewater-Raritan Invitational Tournament of Excellence (BRITE) three times in a row and once was a quarter-finalist. In 2009, for the first time, the STARS were named Champions in BRITE and placed 30th out of 119 at Questions Unlimited's National Academic Championship. It has qualified for nationals thrice. It competes in Tri-State area events and has branched out to other competitions, namely History Bowl, in which it placed 51st in 2018, and 24th in 2019. In 2021, JPS Quiz Bowl tied for 31st place at HSNCT nationals, with the B team having tied for 49th place and the History Bowl team having placed 21st. The Quizbowl team has additionally placed highly at regional tournaments, including first place at Princeton University's PHSAT XXVIII. In the 2022–23 season, the JP Stevens Quiz Bowl team was ranked 8th in the country.

=== Music ===
==== Choir ====
The J.P. Stevens Choir has won numerous awards, including Best Overall Choir at National and State competitions.

In 2017, JPS Chamber Choir and A cappella Ensemble both participated in the Interkultur Sing 'N'Joy Princeton International Choir Competition. A cappella Ensemble was named Category Winner for the Sacred Music Category and Chamber Choir was named Category Winner in the Mixed Choir level 1 Category. A capella Ensemble also performed at Carnegie Hall in the Stern Auditorium. Chamber Choir was also the Grand Prize Winner, with an endowed prize of US$2000. Moreover, the Chamber Choir received the Special Prize of an autographed copy of the first four measures of Morten Lauridsen's "O Magnum Mysterium," presented by the composer.

Many students from the choir are accepted into the Regions II Choir, the NJ All-State Choir, All-Eastern High School Honor Choir, and Governor's School of the Arts:

- Concert Choir
- A Cappella Ensemble
- Tenor-Bass Choir
- Treble Choir
- Chamber Ensemble

==== Band ====
The J.P. Stevens High School band program has approximately 200 students participating in several ensembles, including a marching band, jazz ensemble, and wind ensemble. The program enjoys the majority of its success with its wind bands and jazz ensembles. Its wind ensemble is a perennial participant at the New Jersey Concert Band Gala and Mid-Atlantic Honors Wind Band Festival, and has performed as a featured band at Music for All's National Concert Band Festival twice, in 2015 and 2023. In addition, its jazz ensemble has won eleven state championships, including a three-peat from 2009 to 2011 and a four-peat from 2016 to 2019.

=== Greenhouse ===
The John P. Stevens Greenhouse was founded in September 2014 by the school's environmental science teacher. The 30 by 60 feet (9.1 by 18.3 m) greenhouse is used to a variety of organic foods each season and is entirely run by students, and their two advisors.

== Campus ==
Located in the Oak Tree neighborhood of the township, it rapidly expanded as the northern part of Edison grew, including residents from the Stephenville and New Dover communities. Originally, JPS was a senior high school, serving grades 10 through 12. In 1984, the Edison School District changed the junior high schools into middle schools, adding 9th grade into JPS.

== Awards and recognition ==
In Newsweek's listing of "America's Best High Schools 2016", the school was ranked 127th of the 500 best high schools in the country; it was ranked 23rd among all high schools in New Jersey and tenth among the state's non-magnet schools.

In its 2013 report on "America's Best High Schools", The Daily Beast ranked the school 294th in the nation among participating public high schools and 23rd among schools in New Jersey. in fact, famous singer/songwriter Andrew Fromm graduated from this school in 1993.

In the 2011 "Ranking America's High Schools" issue by The Washington Post, the school was ranked 33rd in New Jersey and 1,151st nationwide.

According to U.S. News & World Report, J.P. Stevens High School was ranked 36 in New Jersey in 2012, and has a national rank of 781. In 2013, JP Steven's state ranking rose to 32 and its national ranking rose to 467. In the 2025–26 ranking by U.S. News & World Report, J.P. Stevens High School was listed among the top 40% of high schools nationally.

The school was the 30th-ranked public high school in New Jersey out of 339 schools statewide in New Jersey Monthly magazine's September 2014 cover story on the state's "Top Public High Schools", using a new ranking methodology. The school had been ranked 80th in the state of 328 schools in 2012, after being ranked 65th in 2010 out of 322 schools listed. The magazine ranked the school 52nd in 2008 out of 316 schools. The school was ranked 82nd in the magazine's September 2006 issue, which included 316 schools across the state. Schooldigger.com ranked the school tied for 97th out of 381 public high schools statewide in its 2011 rankings (an increase of 7 positions from the 2010 ranking) which were based on the combined percentage of students classified as proficient or above proficient on the mathematics (88.3%) and language arts literacy (95.1%) components of the High School Proficiency Assessment (HSPA).

The graduating class of 2013 had 31 National Merit Scholarship Semi-Finalists and 62 Commended Students.

In 2015, CNN featured J.P. Stevens as "The $2.5 billion high school", highlighting three e-commerce companies founded by recent graduates.

== Notable alumni ==
Notable alumni include those who have been inducted into the school's Hall of Honor:

- Peter J. Barnes III (born 1956, class of 1974), New Jersey Superior Court judge who served in the New Jersey General Assembly and New Jersey Senate, where he represented the 18th Legislative District
- David Bryan (born 1962), keyboardist for the hard rock band Bon Jovi
- Jun Choi (born 1971), former Mayor of Edison
- Steven Fulop (born 1977, class of 1995), former mayor of Jersey City
- Greg Gigantino (born c. 1955), college football coach who was the head football coach for Iona College in 1984
- Glen Hellman (born 1955, class of 1974), executive coach, writer and former angel investor
- John Jay Hoffman (born 1965, class of 1983), lawyer who served as the acting attorney general of New Jersey from 2013 to 2016
- Chris Petrucelli (born 1962, class of 1980), soccer manager who is currently the head coach of the Chicago Red Stars in the National Women's Soccer League
- Mark L. Polansky (born 1956, class of 1974), NASA astronaut
- David Rosenthal (born 1961), keyboardist, music producer and songwriter
- Matt Salzberg (born 1983/84), businessperson and entrepreneur who co-founded Blue Apron (where he was CEO), Embark Veterinary and Suma Brands
- Akhil Sharma (born 1971), author and professor of creative writing who wrote the novels An Obedient Father and Family Life
- Janet Smith (1965–2025), former long-distance runner who competed in the 5000-meter run, 10000-meter run and cross country
- George A. Spadoro (born 1948, class of 1966), politician who served three terms as Mayor of Edison, and two terms in the New Jersey General Assembly, where he represented the 18th Legislative District
- Joel Stein (born 1971, class of 1989), journalist, media personality and columnist for the Los Angeles Times
- Jeremy Zuttah (born 1986, class of 2004), former NFL football player for the Baltimore Ravens

== Former headteachers ==
The school's principal is Fay Kim.
