= Let's Go (book series) =

America travel guide books

Let's Go, Inc.
- Industry: Publications
- Genre: Travel guides
- Founded: 1960
- Founder: Oliver Koppell; Harvard Student Agencies
- Defunct: 2022
- Headquarters: Cambridge, MA, USA
- Area served: Worldwide
- Products: Travel guidebooks
- Parent: Harvard Student Agencies

Let's Go was a travel guide series researched, written, edited, and run entirely by students at Harvard University. Let's Go was founded in 1960 and headquartered in Cambridge, Massachusetts.

== History ==
The first Let's Go guide was a 25-page mimeographed pamphlet put together by 18-year-old Harvard freshman Oliver Koppell and handed out on student charter flights to Europe.

In 1996, Let's Go launched its website, Letsgo.com, while publishing 22 titles and a new line of mini map guides.

Let's Go announced a new print publisher, Avalon Travel, upon the expiration of its contract with St. Martin's Press in 2009. The switch led to a new format for the insides of the books, new retro covers for the outsides, and a rebranding to emphasize Let's Go's student origins. The theme has been changed in 1999, 2002, 2005 and 2009. In 2014, Let's Go began self-publishing for the first time since 1970.

Production of Let's Go was suspended in 2020 as a result of the COVID-19 pandemic, and never restarted.

== Editorial style ==
Let's Go has used many words to describe the style of its content. "Witty and irreverent" is possibly the most frequently used descriptor; the company takes pride in its youthful, casual, sometimes zany tone and trains its writers to avoid "brochure-ese". Let's Go also promotes the unvarnished opinions of its reviews, stating that they want the takeaway of every single listing, good or bad, to be clear to the reader. This honesty led to a lawsuit against Let's Go in 1990 as a result of a scathing review of an Israeli hostel, but the travel guide was victorious in court, upheld by the judges as "the modern equivalents of Thomas Paine or John Peter Zenger." Other traits the company has emphasized include its budget roots and social consciousness.

== Titles ==
As of the 2019 series of guidebooks, Let's Go has published 75 titles covering six continents. The books range from country guides to adventure, city, budget, and road trip guides, many of which are still updated annually. Let's Go also published 20 abridged, pocket-sized "map guides" (Amsterdam, Berlin, Boston, Chicago, Dublin, Florence, Hong Kong, London, Los Angeles, Madrid, New Orleans, New York City, Paris, Prague, Rome, San Francisco, Seattle, Sydney, Venice, and Washington DC).

| Book | Type | Continent | First published | Last published | Notes |
|---|---|---|---|---|---|
| Let's Go II: The Student Guide to Adventure | Adventure | Multiple | 1968 | 1968 | Limited edition |
| Let's Go: Alaska Adventure Guide | Adventure | North America | 2004 | 2004 | |
| Let's Go: Alaska & the Pacific Northwest | Country | North America | 1988 | 2003 | Split into Let's Go: Alaska Adventure Guide and Let's Go: Pacific Northwest |
| Let's Go: Amsterdam | City | Europe | 2002 | 2008 | |
| Let's Go: Budget Amsterdam | Budget | Europe | 2012 | 2012 | |
| Let's Go: Amsterdam & Brussels | City | Europe | 2011 | 2011 | |
| Let's Go: Budget Athens | Budget | Europe | 2012 | 2012 | |
| Let's Go: Australia | Country | Australia | 1998 | 2009 | |
| Let's Go: Austria | Country | Europe | 1994 | 1994 | |
| Let's Go: Austria & Switzerland | Country | Europe | 1995 | 2005 | |
| Let's Go: Barcelona | City | Europe | 2002 | 2010 | |
| Let's Go: Budget Barcelona | Budget | Europe | 2012 | 2012 | |
| Let's Go: Budget Berlin | Budget | Europe | 2012 | 2012 | |
| Let's Go: Berlin, Prague & Budapest | City | Europe | 2010 | 2011 | |
| Let's Go: Boston | City | North America | 2001 | 2011 | |
| Let's Go: Brazil | Country | South America | 2004 | 2004 | |
| Let's Go: Great Britain | Country | Europe | 1976 | 2011 | Originally called Let's Go: Britain & Ireland; Open Library: 1999 |
| Let's Go: Buenos Aires | City | South America | 2009 | 2010 | |
| Let's Go: California | Country | North America | 1995 | 2005 | Open Library: 1999 |
| Let's Go: California & Hawaii | Country | North America | 1988 | 1994 | Became Let's Go: California |
| Let's Go: California & the Pacific Northwest | Country | North America | 1984 | 1987 | Split into Let's Go: Alaska & the Pacific Northwest and Let's Go: California & Hawaii |
| Let's Go: Caribbean | Country | North America | 1970 | 1970 | Limited edition |
| Let's Go: Central America | Country | North America | 1996 | 2010 | |
| Let's Go: Chile | Country | South America | 2003 | 2005 | |
| Let's Go: China | Country | Asia | 2000 | 2005 | |
| Let's Go: Costa Rica | Country | North America | 2003 | 2010 | |
| Let's Go: Costa Rica, Nicaragua & Panama | Country | North America | 2010 | 2010 | |
| Let's Go: Eastern Europe | Country | Europe | 1995 | 2008 | |
| Let's Go: Ecuador | Country | South America | 1997 | 2005 | Two incarnations have existed; the original became Let's Go: Peru & Ecuador |
| Let's Go: Egypt | Country | Africa | 2002 | 2003 | |
| Let's Go: Europe | Country | Europe | 1960 | 2020 | Open Library: 1987, 1995, 1998, 1999 |
| Let's Go: Europe Top 10 Cities | City | Europe | 2012 | 2012 | |
| Let's Go: European Riviera | Country | Europe | 2011 | 2011 | |
| Let's Go: Florence | City | Europe | 2010 | 2010 | |
| Let's Go: Budget Florence | Budget | Europe | 2012 | 2012 | |
| Let's Go: France | Country | Europe | 1978 | 2011 | Open Library: 1981, 1995 |
| Let's Go: Germany | Country | Europe | 1995 | 2011 | Open Library: 1999 |
| Let's Go: Germany, Austria & Switzerland | Country | Europe | 1992 | 1993 | Split into Let's Go: Germany & Switzerland and Let's Go: Austria |
| Let's Go: Germany & Switzerland | Country | Europe | 1994 | 1994 | Split into Let's Go: Germany and Let's Go: Austria & Switzerland |
| Let's Go: Greece | Country | Europe | 1984 | 2010 | Two incarnations have existed; the original became Let's Go: Greece & Turkey |
| Let's Go: Greece, Israel & Egypt | Country | Multiple | 1981 | 1983 | Split into Let's Go: Greece and Let's Go: Israel & Egypt |
| Let's Go: Greece & Turkey | Country | Multiple | 1992 | 1998 | Open Library: 1996; Split into Let's Go: Greece and Let's Go: Turkey |
| Let's Go: Guatemala & Belize | Country | North America | 2010 | 2010 | |
| Let's Go: Hawaii | Country | North America | 2003 | 2009 | |
| Let's Go: India & Nepal | Country | Asia | 1997 | 2004 | |
| Let's Go: Ireland | Country | Europe | 1994 | 2013 | Open Library: 1995, 1998 |
| Let's Go: Israel | Country | Asia | 2000 | 2012 | |
| Let's Go: Israel & Egypt | Country | Multiple | 1984 | 1999 | Open Library: 1997; Became Let's Go: Israel |
| Let's Go: Budget Istanbul | Budget | Europe | 2012 | 2012 | |
| Let's Go: Istanbul, Athens & the Greek Islands | City | Multiple | 2011 | 2011 | |
| Let's Go: Italy | Country | Europe | 1979 | 2013 | Open Library: 1980, 1998 |
| Let's Go: Japan | Country | Asia | 2004 | 2004 | |
| Let's Go: London | City | Europe | 1991 | 2008 | Open Library: 1993, 1998 |
| Let's Go: Budget London | Budget | Europe | 2012 | 2014 | |
| Let's Go: London, Oxford & Cambridge | City | Europe | 2010 | 2013 | Originally called Let's Go: London, Oxford, Cambridge & Edinburgh |
| Let's Go: Budget Madrid | Budget | Europe | 2012 | 2012 | |
| Let's Go: Madrid & Barcelona | City | Europe | 2011 | 2011 | |
| Let's Go: Mexico | Country | North America | 1985 | 2008 | Open Library: 1999 |
| Let's Go: Middle East | Country | Multiple | 2000 | 2003 | |
| Let's Go: New York City | City | North America | 1991 | 2011 | Open Library: 1999 |
| Let's Go: New Zealand | Country | Australia | 1998 | 2008 | Temporarily became Let's Go: New Zealand Adventure Guide |
| Let's Go: New Zealand Adventure Guide | Adventure | Australia | 2005 | 2005 | Reverted to Let's Go: New Zealand |
| Let's Go: Pacific Northwest | Country | North America | 2004 | 2004 | Became Let's Go: Pacific Northwest Adventure Guide |
| Let's Go: Pacific Northwest Adventure Guide | Adventure | North America | 2005 | 2005 | |
| Let's Go: Paris | City | Europe | 1993 | 2011 | |
| Let's Go: Budget Paris | Budget | Europe | 2012 | 2014 | |
| Let's Go: Paris, Amsterdam & Brussels | City | Europe | 2013 | 2013 | |
| Let's Go: Peru | Country | South America | 2005 | 2005 | |
| Let's Go: Peru & Ecuador | Country | South America | 2000 | 2000 | Became Let's Go: Peru, Ecuador & Bolivia |
| Let's Go: Peru, Ecuador & Bolivia | Country | South America | 2001 | 2003 | Split into Let's Go: Peru and Let's Go: Ecuador |
| Let's Go: Budget Prague | Budget | Europe | 2012 | 2012 | |
| Let's Go: Puerto Rico | Country | North America | 2004 | 2008 | |
| Let's Go: Roadtripping USA | Roadtrip | North America | 2005 | 2011 | |
| Let's Go: Rome | City | Europe | 1993 | 2010 | |
| Let's Go: Budget Rome | Budget | Europe | 2012 | 2012 | |
| Let's Go: Rome, Venice & Florence | City | Europe | 2011 | 2013 | |
| Let's Go: San Francisco | City | North America | 2001 | 2004 | |
| Let's Go: South Africa | Country | Africa | 1999 | 2003 | |
| Let's Go: Southeast Asia | Country | Asia | 1996 | 2005 | |
| Let's Go: Southwest USA Adventure Guide | Adventure | North America | 2002 | 2004 | |
| Let's Go: Spain & Portugal | Country | Europe | 1984 | 2013 | Originally called Let's Go: Spain, Portugal & Morocco; Open Library: 1991, 1995 |
| Let's Go: Thailand | Country | Asia | 1994 | 2010 | Two incarnations have existed; the original became Let's Go: Southeast Asia |
| Let's Go: Turkey | Country | Multiple | 1999 | 2003 | |
| Let's Go: USA | Country | North America | 1969 | 2008 | Open Library: 1993, 1996, 1999 |
| Let's Go: Vietnam | Country | Asia | 2005 | 2007 | |
| Let's Go: Washington, D.C. | City | North America | 1992 | 2004 | Open Library: 1998 |
| Let's Go: Western Europe | Country | Europe | 2001 | 2010 | |
| Let's Go: Yucatán Peninsula | Country | North America | 2010 | 2010 | |

== Notable alumni ==
Because Let's Go employees are all students when working for the travel guide, many of its alumni have gone on to careers in travel writing and other areas.

- Megan Amram, comedy writer and Twitter celebrity
- Jesse Andrews, novelist and screenwriter of the novel Me and Earl and the Dying Girl (2012)
- Darren Aronofsky, film director
- Jenny Lyn Bader, playwright
- Rick Barton, diplomat
- Elif Batuman, Turkish author and journalist
- Ben Beach, marathoner
- Jess Bravin, journalist and author
- Lisa Brennan-Jobs, journalist, author, and daughter of Steve Jobs
- Irin Carmon, writer and blogger
- Pete Deemer, tech entrepreneur
- David Eilenberg, television executive
- Eleni Gage, author
- James Gleick, author and essayist.
- Kristin Gore, author, screenwriter, and daughter of Al Gore
- Barak Goodman, Oscar-nominated documentarian
- Ellen P. Goodman, Rutgers Law professor
- Adam Grant, organizational psychologist and Wharton professor
- Frank Huddle, Jr., former U.S. ambassador to Tajikistan
- Pico Iyer, travel writer, essayist, and novelist
- Kent M. Keith, author and academic
- Oliver Koppell, New York politician
- Andrew Laming, Australia politician
- Eric Lesser, Massachusetts politician
- Justin Levitt, American constitutional law professor
- Jane Lindholm, National Public Radio host
- Annie Lowrey, journalist
- Nathan Lump, travel writer
- Ghen Maynard, television producer and executive
- Celeste Ng, author
- Joanna O'Leary, food writer and literary historian
- Julie Cotler Pottinger, romance author
- Jeffrey Rosen, author and legal commentator
- Claire Saffitz, food writer
- Peter Sagal, radio host and writer
- Elizabeth Scarlett, author and professor, University at Buffalo
- Ashley Shuyler, founder of AfricAid
- Martin Sixsmith, author and TV/radio presenter
- Kaitlin Solimine, writer
- Alex Speier, sportswriter for the Boston Globe
- Adam Stein, screenwriter and director
- Thomas G. Stemberg, businessman and venture capitalist, co-founder of Staples Inc.
- Nicholas Stoller, screenwriter and director
- Andrew Tobias, columnist, author, and DNC treasurer
- Lisa Tolliver, media personality and academic-practitioner
- Graeme C.A. Wood, journalist and contributing editor at The Atlantic

== In popular culture ==
There have been references (in a non-review/article context) to Let's Go in:

=== Films ===
- Bridget Jones's Diary (2001)
- What a Girl Wants (2003)
- Me and Earl and the Dying Girl (2015)

=== Music ===
- Let's Go (Rancid album), 1994 album

=== Print ===
- Either/Or (2022), novel
- The Economist
- MAD, magazine
- The Marriage Plot (2011), novel
- The Onion

=== Television ===
- Futurama
- Gilmore Girls
- How I Met Your Mother
- Seinfeld
- The Colbert Report
- The Daily Show
- The Simpsons
- Who Wants To Be A Millionaire?
