= CAMS =

CAMS, Cams, or cams may refer to:

== Organizations ==
- California Academy of Mathematics and Science, a high school in Carson, California, United States
- Calexico Mission School, a Seventh-day Adventist Church school, California, United States
- Center for Advanced Media Studies, a research center at the Johns Hopkins University
- Chantiers Aéro-Maritimes de la Seine, a French aircraft manufacturer of the 1920s and 1930s
- Chinese Academy of Management Science, a deregistered public institution in Beijing, China
- Chinese Academy of Medical Sciences, a medical research institution in Beijing, China
- Coalition Against Militarism in Our Schools, a nonprofit organization in the United States
- Computer Age Management Services, Indian mutual fund agency
- Copernicus Atmosphere Monitoring Service (CAMS)
- Motorsport Australia, formerly the Confederation of Australian Motor Sport, the national sporting organisation vested with the authority to conduct motor sport in Australia by the FIA
- Cameras for All-Sky Meteor Surveillance, a project from the SETI Institute that tracks meteor showers globally

== Other uses ==
- Cham Albanians, or Çams, an Albanian subgroup
- Camshafts, which can be found on Internal combustion engines
- Spring-loaded camming device or cams, a piece of rock climbing or mountaineering protection equipment
- Cell adhesion molecules

== See also ==
- Cam (disambiguation)
- Child and Adolescent Mental Health Services (CAMHS)
