= Egginton (surname) =

Egginton is an English surname. Notable people with the surname include:

- Frank Egginton (1908–1990), British contemporary painter
- Tony Egginton (born 1951), Mayor of Mansfield, England
- William Egginton (born 1969), American literary critic and philosopher

== See also ==
- Eggington (surname)
