= William Egginton =

American literary critic and philosopher

- Born: 1969 (age 56–57); Syracuse, New York
- Education: Dartmouth College, Stanford University
- Occupations: Literary Critic, Literary Theorist, Philosopher, Professor at The Johns Hopkins University
- Spouse: Bernadette Wegenstein
- Writing career
- Language: English, Spanish, German, Italian, French
- Subjects: Spanish and Latin American Literature, Cervantes, Borges, Fictionality, Psychoanalysis, Continental Philosophy

William Egginton (born 1969) is a literary critic and philosopher. He has written extensively on a broad range of subjects, including theatricality, fictionality, literary criticism, psychoanalysis and ethics, religious moderation, and theories of mediation.

== Life and career ==
William Egginton was born in Syracuse, New York in 1969. While pursuing an M.A. at the University of Minnesota in 1992, he met Slavoj Žižek, who was completing a visiting professorship there and whose work has had a lasting influence on his thinking. He received his PhD in Comparative Literature from Stanford University in 1999. His doctoral thesis, "Theatricality and Presence: a Phenomenology of Space and Spectacle in Early Modern France and Spain," was written under the direction of Hans Ulrich Gumbrecht. He currently resides in Baltimore with his spouse, Bernadette Wegenstein. William Egginton is Decker Professor in the Humanities, Chair of the Department of Modern Languages and Literatures, and Director of the Alexander Grass Humanities Institute at the Johns Hopkins University, where he teaches Spanish and Latin American literature, literary theory, and the relation between literature and philosophy.

== Works ==
William Egginton is the author of How the World Became a Stage (2003), Perversity and Ethics (2006), A Wrinkle in History (2007), The Philosopher's Desire (2007), The Theater of Truth (2010), In Defense of Religious Moderation (2011), The Man Who Invented Fiction: How Cervantes Ushered In the Modern World (2016), The Splintering of the American Mind: Identity, Inequality, and Community on Today's College Campuses (2018), The Rigor of Angels: Borges, Heisenberg, Kant, and the Ultimate Nature of Reality (2023), and Alejandro Jodorowsky: Filmmaker and Philosopher (2024). The Rigor of Angels was selected as one of the "Best Books of 2023" by The New Yorker and was described as "challenging, ambitious, and elegant" by The New York Times, who included that work in its 2023 list of "Notable Books" and as one of nine "Critics' Picks" in 2023. The Rigor of Angels was also mentioned as a close contender for the New York Times "10 Best Books of 2023" during an episode of its The Book Review podcast.

Egginton is the co-author of Medialogies: Reading Reality in the Age of Inflationary Media (2017) and What Would Cervantes Do?: Navigating Post-Truth with Spanish Baroque Literature (2022). What Would Cervantes Do? was the subject of a special issue of Hispanic Issues in 2023. He is also co-editor with Mike Sandbothe of The Pragmatic Turn in Philosophy (2004), translator of Lisa Block de Behar's Borges, the Passion of an Endless Quotation (2003, 2nd edition 2014), and co-editor with David E. Johnson of Thinking With Borges (2009).

== Selected bibliography ==
=== Books ===
- Egginton, William (2024). Alejandro Jodorowsky: Filmmaker and Philosopher. New York: Bloomsbury Academic. ISBN 978-1-350-14477-4
- Egginton, William (2023). The Rigor of Angels: Borges, Heisenberg, Kant, and the Ultimate Nature of Reality. New York: Pantheon. ISBN 978-0593316306.
  - Review by Kirkus Reviews
  - Review by The Wall Street Journal
  - Review by The New York Times
  - Review by The Millions
  - Review by The New Yorker - https://www.newyorker.com/best-books-2023
- Castillo, David; Egginton, William (2022). What Would Cervantes Do? Navigating Post-Truth with Spanish Baroque Literature. McGill-Queen's University Press. ISBN 978-0228008156.
- Egginton, William. The Splintering of the American Mind: Identity, Inequality, and the Future of Community. New York: Bloomsbury USA. ISBN 978-1635571332
- Castillo, David R., and William Egginton (2017). Medialogies: Reading Reality in the Age of Inflationary Media. New York: Bloomsbury Academic. ISBN 978-1628923605
- Egginton, William (2016). The Man Who Invented Fiction: How Cervantes Ushered in the Modern World. New York: Bloomsbury USA. ISBN 978-1620401750.
  - Pre-review - Christensen, Bryce: December 1, 2015. Booklist.
- Egginton, William (2011). In Defense of Religious Moderation. New York: Columbia University Press. ISBN 978-0231148788.
  - Review - Daley, Kathleen: June 12, 2011. The Newark Star-Ledger.
  - Review by Kirkus Reviews
- Egginton, William (2009). The Theater of Truth: The Ideology of (Neo)Baroque Aesthetics. Stanford, California: Stanford University Press. ISBN 978-0804769549.
  - Reviewed in: CLIO 39.3 (2010): 402-407; Modern Language Quarterly 73.1 (2012): 98-101; Comparative Literature Studies 49.2 (2012): 311-314; Revista Hispánica Moderna, 64.2 (2011): 222-224; Teatro: Revista de estudios culturales, 24 (2012) PDF available at:http://digitalcommons.conncoll.edu/teatro/vol24/iss24/
- Egginton, William (2007). The Philosopher's Desire: Psychoanalysis, Interpretation, and Truth. Stanford, California: Stanford University Press. ISBN 978-0804755993.
  - Reviewed in Choice 45.6:1-2 (2008); Book News (November 2007) http://www.booknews.com/ref_issues/ref_nov2007/stanford2.html
- Egginton, William (2007). A Wrinkle in History: Essays in Literature and Philosophy. Aurora, Colorado: The Davies Group Publishers. ISBN 978-1888570939.
  - Reviewed in Revista Canadiense de Estudios Hispánicos, 29.3 (Spring 2007) 523-525.
- Egginton, William (2006). Perversity and Ethics. Stanford, California: Stanford University Press. ISBN 978-0804752596.
  - Reviewed in symploklè 14:1-2 (2006):363-4.
- Egginton, William (2003). How the World Became a Stage: Presence, Theatricality and the Question of Modernity. Albany, New York: SUNY Press. ISBN 978-0791455463.
  - Reviewed in Modern Language Notes 118.5 (2003): 1327-1329; Theatre Research International 30.1 (2005): 102-3; Revista canadiense de estudios hispanos 29.3 (2005): 609-11; Bulletin of the Comediantes 57.1 (2005): 217-218.

==== Edited and translated books ====
- Second edition and translation of Lisa Block de Behar, Borges: The Passion of an Endless Quotation, SUNY Press, 2014
- Co-editor, with David E. Johnson, Thinking With Borges, Aurora, CO: The Davies Group Publishers, 2009
- Borges: The Passion of an Endless Quotation, by Lisa Block de Behar, translated and with an introduction by William Egginton, Albany: SUNY Press, 2003
- Co-editor, with Mike Sandbothe, The Pragmatic Turn in Philosophy: Contemporary Engagements Between Analytic and Continental Thought, Albany: SUNY Press, 2004
- Co-editor, with Jeffrey T. Schnapp and Peter Gilgen, Disciplining Literature. Stanford Humanities Review 6.1 (1998)

==== Chapters in books ====
- “Jodorowsky, Psychomagic, and Subjective Destitution,” in ReFocus: The Films of Alejandro Jodorowsky, ed. Michael Witte (Edinburgh and London: Edinburgh University Press, 2023)
- “Realism/New Realism,” in The Vattimo Dictionary, ed. Simonetta Moro (Edinburgh and London: Edinburgh University Press, 2023), 163-165
- “Foreword,” in Un-Deceptions: Cervantine Strategies For the Disinformation Age, by David Castillo (Newark, Delaware: Juan de la Cuesta, 2021)
- “Cervantes, Reality Literacy and Fundamentalism.” Cervantes and the New Millennium. Ed. Bruce Burningham, Millennial Cervantes, UNC Press, 2020
- “Cervantes’s Treatment of Otherness, Contamination, and Conventional Ideals in Persiles and Other Works,” with David Castillo, in Cervantes’ Persiles, ed., Marina Brownlee, University of Toronto Press, 2019, 205-222
- “The Apocalypse Will Not Be Televised! Baroque Lessons in Apocalypticism, Demagoguery, and Reality Literacy,” with David Castillo, Writing in the End Times: Apocalyptic Imagination in the Hispanic World, Hispanic Issues Online Issue 23 (2019); 16-30, https://cla.umn.edu/sites/cla.umn.edu/files/hiol_23_01_castillo_and_egginton.pdf
- “The Screen Behind the Screen: A Penultimate Response to a Polemical Companion,” with David Castillo, in A Polemical Companion to Medialogies: Reading Reality in the Age of Inflationary Media. Eds. Bradley Nelson and Julio Baena. HIOL Debates 8 (2017): 132-146. Web.
- “Afterword,” with David Castillo, in Freakish Encounters: Constructions of the Freak in Hispanic Cultures, ed. Luis Martin Estudillo, 2018: https://cla.umn.edu/hispanic-issues/online/volume-20-freakish-encounters
- “The Philosopher’s Baroque: Benjamin, Lacan, Deleuze,” in the Oxford Handbook to the Baroque, ed. John D. Lyons, Oxford University Press, 2019, 487-496
- “What Kind of Humanities Do We Want or Need in the 21stCentury?” with David Castillo, in López-Calvo, Ignacio and Christina Lux, eds. Humanities and Post-Truth in the Information Age (Northwestern UP, 2019)
- “What Are We Talking About When We Talk About Zombies?” The Philosophical Salon: Speculations, Reflections, Interventions, eds. Michael Marder and Patricia Vieira, London, Open Humanities Press, 2017, 121-24
- “The Empire of Solitude,” with David Castillo, The Philosophical Salon: Speculations, Reflections, Interventions, eds. Michael Marder and Patricia Vieira, London, Open Humanities Press, 2017, 37-41
- Can Neuroscience Overturn Roe v. Wade?" in The Stone Reader: Modern Philosophy in 133 Arguments, eds. Peter Catapano and Simon Critchley, New York: Norton, 2016.
- "The Limits of the Coded World," in The Stone Reader: Modern Philosophy in 133 Arguments, eds. Peter Catapano and Simon Critchley, New York: Norton, 2016.
- "Bodies in Motion: An Exchange," with Alex Rosenberg, in The Stone Reader: Modern Philosophy in 133 Arguments, eds. Peter Catapano and Simon Critchley, New York: Norton, 2016.
- "Afterword: What Are We Talking About When We Talk About Zombies," in Castillo, Schmid, Reilly, and Browning, Zombie Talk: Culture, History, Politics, New York: Palgrave, 2016, 106-114.
- "Borges on Eternity," in Eternity, a History, ed. Yitzhak Y. Melamed, Oxford: Oxford University Press, 2016, 277-282.
- "Crime Shows—CSI: Hapsburg Madrid," in Peter Goodrich and Valerie Hayaert (eds), Genealogies of Legal Vision, London: Routledge, 2015, 243-58
- "The Eradication of Transcendence," in Braidotti et al. eds, The Postsecular Turn, 2014
- "Potentiality of Life," in Silvia Mazzini ed., Reading Hermeneutic Communism, Continuum, 2014
- "Staging the Event: The Theatrical Ground of Metaphysical Framing," in Michael Marder and Santiago Zabala, eds. Being Shaken, Palgrave, 2014, 177-85
- "¿Tolerancia o fundamentalismo: una pregunta contemporánea," interview collected in Diálogos en la Finis Terrae: Entrevistas de Marco Antonio de la Parra, ed. Constanza López (Santiago de Chile: Ediciones Finis Terrae, 2013): 39-50
- "Neither Here nor There: The Everyday Dialectics of Manuel Cruz," in Vivir para pensar, eds. Fina Birulés, Antonio Gómez Ramos and Concha Roldán, Madrid: Paidós, 2011
- "Three Versions of Divisibility: Borges, Kant, and the Quantum," Thinking With Borges, eds. Egginton and Johnson, Aurora, CO, The Davies Group, 2009, 53-72
- Co-author, with Bernadette Wegenstein, UNESCO Online Encyclopedia of Social Sciences and Humanities—"Media Impact on Literature" entry, (2008)
- "Intimacy and Anonymity, or How the Audience Became a Crowd," Crowds, eds. Jeffrey T. Schnapp and Matthew Tiews, Stanford: Stanford University Press, 2007, 97-110
- "Keeping Pragmatism Pure: Rorty with Lacan," in Egginton and Sandbothe, eds., The Pragmatic Turn in Philosophy: Contemporary Engagements Between Analytic and Continental Thought (Albany, NY: SUNY Press, 2004)
- "Sobre el espaciamiento: el espacio paranoico del Dr. Francia," in Espacios y discurosos compartidos en la literatura de América Latina. Actas del Coloquio Internacional del Comité de Estudios Latinoamericanos de la Asociación Internacional de Literatura Comparada, ed. Biagio D'Angelo (Lima: Fondo Editorial de la Universidad Católica Sedes Sapientiae-Fondo, Editorial de la Universidad Nacional Mayor de San Marcos, 2003) 102-110
- "Facing the Defacement of Death: Heidegger, Deleuze, and García Lorca," Convergencias Hispanicas: Selected Proceedings And Other Essays On Spanish And Latin American Literature, Film, And Linguistics, eds. Elizabeth Scarlett and Howard B.Wescott (Juan de la Cuesta Hispanic Monographs, 2002) 103-118
- "Mímesis e teatralidade," in Mascaras da mimesis: a obra de Luiz Costa Lima (Rio de Janeiro: Record Editora, 1999) 321-342
