= Martina Pippal =

Austrian art historian and artist

- Born: 1957 (age 68–69); Vienna, Austria
- Education: PhD in art history, University of Vienna
- Occupations: Art historian artist

Martina Pippal (born 1957) is an Austrian art historian and a painter and sculptor.

== Biography ==
Martina Pippal was born 1957 in Vienna as the daughter of the painter Hans Robert Pippal (1915–1998) and the architect Eugenie Pippal-Kottnig (1921–1998). Growing up in the studio of her parents she early acquired skills in several artistic techniques. In addition to her artistic inclination, she got interested in the socioeconomic and political backgrounds of the conditions of artistic production. She started university studies in art history, classical archeology, history and theology at the University of Vienna, and acquired her PhD in Art History (complementary field: History) 1981 there. Since her Habilitation 1991 she works as an associate professor at the Department of Art History of the University of Vienna. Around 1995 she started her artistic career as a painter and sculptor.

== Research interests ==
Martina Pippal's scholarly approach to the history of visual media relies on the methodology of cultural studies combined with iconology, and stylistic analysis in the tradition of the Vienna School of Art History. She is particularly interested in the period of Late Antiquity and Early Middle Ages, but also in the visual media of the 20th century and contemporary art.

== Selected works ==
Books Source:

- Pippal, M.: Kunst des Mittelalters – Eine Einführung: Von den Anfängen der christlichen Kunst bis zum Ende des Hochmittelalters, Vienna: UTB Böhlau, 3rd ed. 2010, ISBN 3-205-77455-8.
- Pippal, M., Wegenstein, B.: Die Arbeit am eigenen Körper, Picus 2009
- Pippal, M.: Wie im Zirkus: Erinnerungen eines Künstlerkindes, Vienna: Violetta Ritterling 2008, ISBN 3-9502482-0-X.
- Pippal, M., Rychlik, O., Voggeneder, E.: Hans Robert Pippal: Zwischen Innovation und Tradition, Vienna: Böhlau 2003, ISBN 3-205-77137-0.
- Pippal, M.: A Short History of Art in Vienna, Munich: C.H. Beck 2000 (also published in German as Kleine Kunstgeschichte Wiens), ISBN 978-3-406-46789-9.
- Pippal, M.: Das Perikopenbuch von St. Erentrud: Theologie und Tagespolitik, Vienna: Holzhausen 1997, ISBN 3-900518-62-9.
- Pippal, M.: Die Pfarrkirche von Schöngrabern: Eine ikonologische Untersuchung ihrer Apsisreliefs, Vienna: Austrian Academy of Sciences 1991, 2nd ed. Auflage 1996, ISBN 3-7001-1911-9.
- Fillitz, H., Pippal, M.: Schatzkunst: Die Goldschmiede- und Elfenbeinarbeiten aus österreichischen Schatzkammern des Hochmittelalters, Salzburg: Residenz-Verlag 1987, ISBN 3-7017-0467-8.

Book chapters

- Pippal, M./Horst, T./Blänsdorf, C./Falcon Martinez, M. F.: The Hunt-Lenox Globe – The Original and Replicas of It, in: Globe Studies. The Journal of the International Coronelli Society, ed. by Jan Mokre/International Coronelli Society, 69/2025, Vienna 2025, ISSN 1680-5356, pp. 117–161.
- Pippal, M., in: Michelangelo and Beyond, ed. by Eva Michel and Klaus Albrecht Schröder, Prestel Munich/London/New York 2023, ISBN 978-3-791-39116-8, "The Female and The Dark Side of the Moon, pp. 190–193; "Female Body––Male Witch Panic", pp. 194–201; “… must not, will not, cannot…”, pp. 202–209; "For the Fairest of Them All, or the Judgement of Paris", pp. 216–223; "Terra Incognita: Woman, the Unknown Being", pp. 224–235; "The Cult of Beauty and the Aesthetics of the Ugly", pp. 236–239.
- Pippal, M.: "Die Handregistratur Friedrichs III. – eine Flaschenpost aus “Caesarea”?", in: Wiens erste Moderne. Visuelle Konstruktion von Identitäten im 15. Jahrhundert, ed. by Martina Pippal, Carmen Rob-Santer, Armand Tif, Guido Messling, Veronika Pirker-Aurenhammer and Kunsthistorisches Museum, International Conference: Bildkünsten in Wien zwischen Meister von Heiligenkreuz und Lucas Cranach (Vienna, April 11–14, 2019), Jahrbuch des Kunsthistorischen Museums Wien, Bd. 22, Vanderhoeck & Ruprecht, Vienna Cologne 2023, ISBN 978-3-205-21727-5, pp. 115–130.
- Pippal, M.: "Mahler and the Visual Arts of His Time", in: Youmans, Charles, ed.: Mahler in Context. Cambridge: Cambridge University Press, 2021. pp. 136–146, ISBN 978-1-108-42377-9.
- Pippal, M.: Mascha und Margarita – eine Reise ins Innere der Kunst: zu “Las Meninas” von Diego Velázquez. Vienna: Violetta Ritterling, 2014, ISBN 978-3-9502482-2-7.
- Pippal, M.: "Movements and Being Moved. Painting and Sculpture after 1897", in: H. Androsch, ed.: Austria. Past, Present, Future. Vienna: Brandstätter, 2010. pp. 251–289 (also published in German and Chinese), ISBN 978-3-85033-300-9.
- Pippal, M.: "Soshana in the Context of Austrian Modernism", in: Bäumer, A. and Schueller, A., eds.: Soshana. Life and Work. Vienna/New York: Springer, 2010, pp. 52–117, ISBN 978-3-7091-0274-9.
- Pippal, M.: "Linde Waber – artist, weaver of artistic networks, mentor, mater familias", in: Deppe, R. et al., eds., Linde tröstet Schubert, exhibition catalogue. Vienna: Mandelbaum 2010, pp. 6–8, ISBN 978-3-85476-332-1.
- Pippal, M.: "Der Einband and Die malerische Ausstattung des Sakramentars", in: Das Sakramentar Heinrichs II. – Handschrift Clm 4456 der Bayerischen Staatsbibliothek München', commentary volume of the facsimile edition. Gütersloh/Munich: Faksimile Verlag 2010, pp. 29–38 and 51–124.
- Pippal, M.: "Gustav Mahler und die bildende Kunst – Geschichte einer Beziehung", in: E. Partsch et al., eds.: Contextualizing Mahler – Mahler im Kontext. Vienna: Böhlau 2010, pp. 257–281, ISBN 978-3-205-78496-8.
- Pippal, M.: "Die Handregistratur Friedrichs III. – eine Flaschenpost aus "Caesarea"?", in: Wiens erste Moderne. Visuelle Konstruktion von Identitäten im 15. Jahrhundert. Jahrbuch des Kunsthistorischen Museums Wien, Bd. 22, ed. by Martina Pippal, Carmen Rob-Santer, Armand Tif, Guido Messling, Veronika Pirker-Aurenhammer and Kunsthistorisches Museum, Vienna/Cologne: Böhlau 2023, pp. 115–130, ISBN 978-3-205-21725-1 ISBN 978-3-205-21727-5.

== Exhibitions ==
- 2008: Chiasma: mixed media/fotografie, monastery of Altenburg, Lower Austria.
- 2012: intensiv, Gallery Szaal, Vienna.
- 2019: Menschen_Bilder: Paintings 2006–18, Kunstraum at MuseumsCenter Leoben, Styria.
