= Eggington (surname) =

Eggington is an English surname. Notable people with the surname include:

- Sam Eggington (born 1993), British professional boxer
- William G. Eggington (born 1950), Australian linguist

== See also ==
- Egginton (surname)
