= My First Time =

My First Time may refer to:

- My First Time (album), 2003 album by Look What I Did
- My First Time (play), 2007 off-Broadway play
- My First Time (film series), short film interview series produced by The Paris Review
- My First Time (TV series), 2015 Korean TV series
