= Manter Hall School =

Private prep school in Cambridge, Massachusetts

Coordinates: 42.372°N 71.1182°W

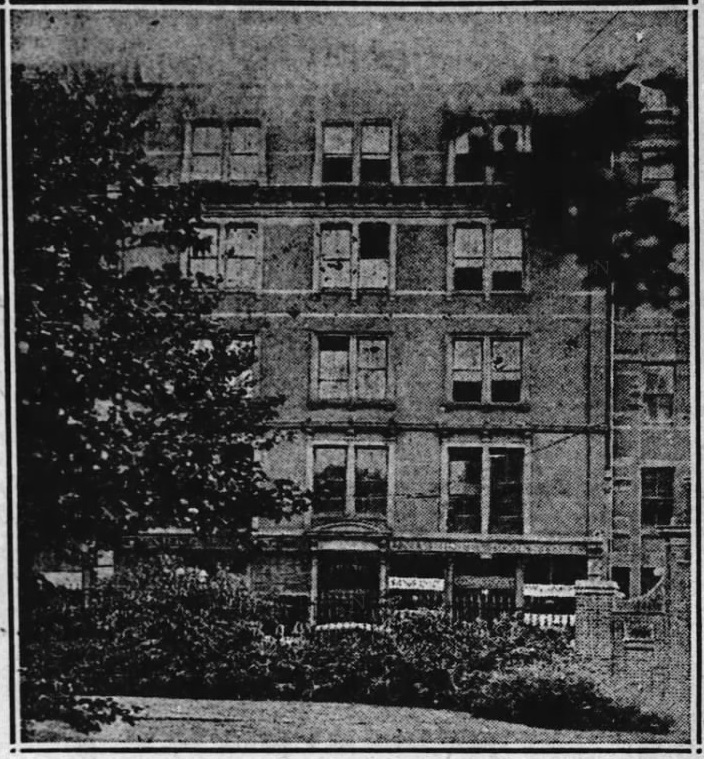
- Little Hall, where Manther Hall School was based from 1908 to 1923, pictured in a 1924 Boston Globe article
- Cambridge, Massachusetts, USA

Information
- Established: 1884
- Closed: 1996
- Enrollment: 50 (1975); 19 (1993)

Manter Hall School was a private prep school located in Cambridge, Massachusetts that existed between 1884 and 1996. Founded in 1884 by William W. Nolen (Harvard, Class of 1884) as Nolen's Tutoring School, the original mission of the school was to tutor Harvard undergraduates to prepare them for mid-term and final examinations. The curriculum expanded in the 1930s to include preparing students for Harvard's entrance exam. Manter Hall eventually evolved into an unorthodox prep school that prepared students who were unable to fit into traditional high schools and prep schools.

Manter Hall's most famous alumni were Joseph P. Kennedy II (Class of 1971), a former Congressman, and Tenley Albright ('58), the first American female skater to win an Olympic gold medal.

== Tutoring Harvard undergrads ==
Tutoring Harvard undergrads was the school's primary mission for fifty years. Located in a building owned by Harvard, the school provided four- and eight-hour cram courses before midterms and final exams.

Nolen died in 1924 and the school moved to Manter Hall, 67 Mt. Auburn Street changing its name to Manter Hall School, Inc. By 1932, the school was tutoring secondary school students who had failed the Harvard entrance exam. The school also enabled Harvard applicants who were shy a few credits to make up those credits in order to qualify for entrance.

During World War II, the school focused on helping aviation cadets pass Harvard's entrance exam. After the war, enrollment swelled to over 250 students, but class size had settled back to 60 by the 1950s. In that decade, it became a standard prep school offering instruction for grades nine through 12 and focused on special needs students.

== Ownership ==
The school was managed by Robert G. Hall, who eventually became its owner, from 1936 until his death in 1996, after which the school was disbanded. Because of Hall's interest in dyslexia, the school implemented a diagnostic reading test in the 1950s. He created Educator's Publishing Services, which published and distributed academic books. Before his death, Hall came to understand the unique educational opportunities Harvard Student Agencies (HSA) afforded to Harvard undergraduates and decided to sell the property to HSA in the spring of 1996. The building was dedicated as Burke-McCoy Hall on February 5, 1997, and became the permanent home for HSA the Let's Go travel guide series.

== Student body ==
By 1975, the student body was down to 50. The school had a tradition for graduates by celebrating graduation at the Newton estate of an old classmate of Mr Hall. The celebration ended with the traditional valedictorian speech. Class sizes were from "four or five to a maximum of ten or twelve," according to owner Hall in a 1975 Harvard Crimson interview, which enabled teachers to give students special attention. The building’s ground floor was leased to retail businesses, most notably Elsie’s delicatessen. Hall said approximately 50% of the student body were remedial students.

A good portion of the student body was derived from Cambridge with the rest of the students from surrounding towns. The school had an international presence as well. The school did not advertise but relied on word of mouth. The school was traditionally run but had much focus on the individual children as they moved through the grades. The school did not have the capacity to offer sports or extracurricular activities but was smack in the middle of Harvard Square which provided its own sort of sport. Tenley Albright became the first girl at the school. The school enabled her to take classes scheduled around her training schedule. She went on to become a surgeon and her two daughters attended the school.

By 1993, there were only 19 students. The last four seniors graduated in 1996.

== Famous alumni ==
- Tenley Albright, 1958
- Joseph P. Kennedy II, 1971
