= APRN =

APRN may stand for:

- Alaska Public Radio Network
- Advanced practice registered nurse
- An Phoblacht Republican News
- Blue Apron stock ticker
