= My First Time (film series) =

My First Time is an ongoing short web series, featuring authors discussing their first published book.

It is produced by The Paris Review and hosted on their website. It is made by filmmakers Tom Bean and Luke Poling, as well as Casey Brooks and Ryan Scafuro. Bean and Poling were the writers and directors of the documentary Plimpton! Starring George Plimpton as Himself. George Plimpton was the founding editor of The Paris Review.

The series is inspired by the magazine's famous "The Art of Fiction" interviews. The LA Times book critic Carolyn Kellog said that the series builds "on that tradition without replicating it." The films feature not only novelists, but also graphic novelists, poets, playwrights and short story writers. In the announcement of the creation series, it was described as, "a portrait of the artist as a beginner—and a look at the creative process, in all its joy, abjection, delusion, and euphoria." The on-line magazine Quartz said of the series, "Buried between the self-deprecation and vague maxims (“just buckle down,” etc.) are some real gems of insight any aspiring writer, artist, creative-type, or modern human being can practically apply to their own work and lives."

The film series debuted in May, 2015. Each film runs approximately 6 minutes.

The filmmakers have teased future films on Twitter and Instagram. Some of the writers interviewed, but whose film has not yet been released include George Saunders, Mary Karr, Victor LaValle, and Dana Spiotta.

== Films ==
- J. Robert Lennon, The Light of Falling Stars
- Gabrielle Bell, The Book of... Mini-Comics
- Branden Jacobs-Jenkins, Neighbors
- Christine Schutt, Nightwork
- Tao Lin, Bed
- Sheila Heti, The Middle Stories
- Donald Antrim, Elect Mr. Robinson for a Better World
- Katori Hall, Hoodoo Love
- Ben Lerner, The Lichtenberg Figures
- Jeffrey Eugenides, The Virgin Suicides
- Helen DeWitt, The Last Samurai
- Vivian Gornick, In Search of Ali Mahmoud: An American Woman in Egypt
- Akhil Sharma, An Obedient Father
- Karl Ove Knausgaard, "Ute av verden" (Out of the World)
