= Embark Veterinary =

Biotechnology company in Boston, Massachusetts

Embark
- Type: Private
- Industry: Genetic Genealogy
- Founded: 2015; 11 years ago
- Founders: Adam Boyko; Ryan Boyko; Matt Salzberg; Spencer Wells
- Headquarters: Boston, Massachusetts
- Products: Embark Dog DNA Test
- Website: embarkvet.com

Embark is a canine genomics and biotechnology company based in Boston, Massachusetts. The company offers dog DNA testing services to consumers, breeders, and veterinarians.

== History ==
Embark was founded in Austin, Texas, in 2015 by brothers Adam Boyko and Ryan Boyko, Matt Salzberg, and Spencer Wells. Prior to the formation of the company, the Boyko brothers spent nearly a decade collecting thousands of DNA samples from dogs for research into the origin of dogs and what DNA can reveal about their health. This led to the formation of Embark, which sells dog DNA tests to dog owners, veterinarians, and breeders. Embark's stated goals are to help pet owners better understand their dog's health and risk for heritable diseases, and to advance canine DNA research in general.

Adam Boyko is an associate professor at Cornell University College of Veterinary Medicine. Ryan Boyko, the company’s CEO, was an independent researcher at Cornell and studied computer science and biology at Harvard University. Wells directed the Genographic Project at the National Geographic Society, and Salzberg is a founder of meal delivery company Blue Apron.

In March 2016, Embark launched publicly with a presentation by the Boyko brothers at South by Southwest. That year, the startup began offering its DNA tests for dogs. In 2016, Embark raised a $1.6 million seed round investment, from lead investors Slow Ventures and Aspiration Growth Fund. The company raised an additional $4.5 million in seed funding in the summer of 2017, led by Founder Collective, and including 23andMe founder Anne Wojcicki.

In 2017, Embark relocated its headquarters from Austin to Boston, with its main science team remaining in Ithaca, New York. That year, the company was inducted into the McGovern Center, Cornell's incubator for life science companies. Embark is a research partner of Cornell University College of Veterinary Medicine.

== Criticism ==
The company uses submitted genetic data for research unless the customer opts out, raising privacy concerns. Some veterinarians have expressed skepticism about the lack of standards in DNA testing for dogs and the difficulty in properly analyzing and understanding the data, while acknowledging the potential of genetics to treat diseases. In 2018, NPR reported on shortcomings for DNA tests for dogs, including an incorrect analysis of the genetic data that can lead to unnecessary medical treatment and questionable clinical decisions. In 2018, science journal Nature ran an article by a veterinarian and two scientists stating that "pet genetics must be reined in" to avoid misinterpreting data.

== Research ==
In July 2017, Embark worked with Cornell University to test more than 6,000 dogs of various breeds in order to identify the genetic mutation that causes blue eyes, which was the first research of its kind to be conducted on non-humans. Dog owners conducted DNA tests from Embark, completed online surveys, and Embark and Cornell analyzed the data. Researchers discovered a genetic tweak in Siberian Huskies that can cause blue-eyed dogs.

Adam Boyko was part of a team of scientists who in 2015 discovered that the origin of domestic dogs was near Central Asia 15,000 years ago. In 2016, he was the senior author of a study by Cornell College of Veterinary Medicine researchers that was the largest genetic study of dogs to ever be completed, with a collection of samples that included the DNA of more than 10,000 dogs from around the world. The researchers compared dogs of different purebred breeds in a large-scale genome-wide association study. It was published in the journal Nature Communication.

== See also ==
- 23andMe
- Ancestry.com
