= Ute av verden =

1998 debut novel by Norwegian writer Karl Ove Knausgård

- Cover of the Norwegian first edition
- Author: Karl Ove Knausgård
- Cover artist: Yngve Knausgård (design), Jock Sturges (photo)
- Language: Norwegian Bokmål
- Publisher: Tiden Norsk Forlag
- Publication date: 1998
- Publication place: Norway
- Pages: 699 pages
- ISBN: 8210041932
- Dewey Decimal: 839.82374 839.82 839.82s 839.823[S]

Ute av verden (direct translation: Out of the World) is the 1998 debut novel by Norwegian writer Karl Ove Knausgård. Knausgård was awarded the Norwegian Critics Prize for Literature for the book. This was the first time in the award's history that a first-time author had won.

In his interview for The Paris Review's My First Time, Knausgard described the book's writing process as not being "related to me, in any normal sense. I'm writing things that I never could think of. It's like there's something else coming out there. And I think that's the definition of writing. It was a very good time for me."

== Synopsis ==
The book is divided into three parts. In the first part, the 26-year-old Henrik Vankel, the story's narrator, is a substitute teacher at an elementary school in Northern Norway. He falls in love with his 13-year-old pupil Miriam, and after a sexual experience with the girl, he is forced to flee the village. He decides to return to the city where he lived for several years during his early youth: Kristiansand in Southern Norway.

In the second part, as Henrik is on his way to Kristiansand, he recedes to the background of the narrative. Instead this part focuses on his parents: how they met, how their relationship developed, how they had children and established a home. Ingrid is a young girl from a small village in Western Norway, visiting a friend in Kristiansand. Here she meets the local boy Harald, and decides to seduce him. They spend a night together, but later Harald shies away. Only when she disowns him completely is his interest piqued, and he decides to win her back. They eventually move in together and have a child, but struggle with acceptance from Harald's domineering father, and with Harald's own anger issues. As this story ends, they move to Southern Norway with their newborn second son, who is Henrik.

The third part, which is about the same length as the other two combined, Henrik is in Kristiansand. The environment brings back memories, and he starts reflecting on his earlier days. His time in upper secondary school was troubled, with difficulties fitting in socially and disastrous attempts to woo girls. In addition to this, his parents' marriage was falling apart, as his father slipped further into alcoholism and neglect. Back in the present day, Henrik finds out that Miriam is coming to Kristiansand with her family. As the novel ends, Henrik travels to the airport, just to get a glimpse of her. Miriam, however, spots him, runs towards him and embraces him.

The third part also contains a story within a story – a long science fiction-like dream sequence, told in the second person. Here Henrik wakes up to a Kristiansand he vaguely recognises, but is still completely different. Here he is married, and his wife assumes he has amnesia, but he suspects he has landed in a parallel reality. There are no gas or diesel engines, only steam. Historical figures are not always who he remembers them to be: Immanuel Kant is a physician and memoir writer, and Dante is a revolutionary. Henrik gets a job working on a gigantic pillar-like structure in the middle of the ocean, the purpose of which is never made clear. Through research, he finds out that the world he is in parted ways with the one he knows around the time of the burning of the Library of Alexandria, an event that never took place here. At the end of the dream, without finding many real answers, Henrik simply lies down to die.

== Reception ==
Øystein Rottem declared that Knausgård had produced "the greatest literary achievement of the fall" in 1998. Some of the literary comparisons Rottem made were with Agnar Mykle, Knut Hamsun, and Vladimir Nabokov. The Danish translation of the novel was reviewed for Politiken by Søren Vinterberg, who commended its "superb narrative technique and great psychological ambition".

Knausgård was awarded the Norwegian Critics Prize for Literature for 1998 for the book. This was the first time in the award's history that a first-time author had won. In 2006, Norwegian newspaper Dagbladet ranked Ute av verden as number eleven of the twenty-five best novels from the last twenty-five years. Inger Merete Hobbelstad here called it a "cornucopia of a novel", where one was "struck by the long, almost epic similes".

The publication of the novel in Sweden ("Ut ur världen", 2015) caused controversy when literary professor Ebba Witt-Brattström criticised the author's depiction of the 13 year old girl in the novel as "literary pedophilia". This caused Knausgård to respond by calling Sweden "the land of the cyclops", dominated by a one-eyed view.
