= Glen Hellman =

Author, Executive Coach, College Faculty, and Angel investor

- Born: 1 December 1955 (age 70); Brooklyn, New York
- Education: J. P. Stevens High School, University of Maryland
- Occupations: Executive coach and Writer
- Known for: founder and owner of "CxO Elevate, LLC"

Glen Hellman (born December 1, 1955) is an American executive coach, writer and former angel investor. He is founder and owner of "CxO Elevate, LLC". He is known for his blog called Driven Forward, which critiqued Washington, D.C.'s startup ecosystem. The blog ran from 2010 to 2020.

== Early life and education ==
Hellman was born Brooklyn, New York in 1955. His family moved to Edison, New Jersey, in 1960. He graduated from J. P. Stevens High School, in Edison in 1974. He graduated in 1978 with a Bachelor of Arts degree in General Studies from the University of Maryland, College Park.

== Career ==
Hellman began his career in technology startups in 1978. His career spans senior management roles including CEO, CRO, COO, and head of product management. He was an active angel investor and also worked as a turn-around executive for private equity investors. He served as a board chairman and board member for several VC-backed companies, and is a former board member of the University of Maryland, Dingman Center for Entrepreneurship. He worked as an on-camera Business Strategy Analyst for NBC in Washington, D.C., and spent a decade as a turn-around CEO for private equity investors.

Over the past 15 years, Hellman has provided executive leadership coaching to more than 100 CEOs.

Since 2007, Hellman has been an executive coach, gaining his training through Vistage International. He is founder and owner of "CxO Elevate, LLC".

From 2009 until 2019, Hellman was a prolific tech blogger and critic of the Washington DC area startup scene, garnering featured articles that included, "Is the Blogger "Mr. Cranky" Out to Save DC's Tech," Washingtonian Magazine, and "Mr. Cranky: Glen Hellman calls it like he sees it, whether D.C. tech likes it or not,' Washington Business Journal.

Currently, Hellman is an independent executive coach and peer group facilitator. He works half time as a member of the Faculty at the University of Maryland, A. James Clark School of Engineering, where he coaches the National Science Foundation and I-Corps program, instructing and coaching STEM Ph.D. and Post Doc researchers on customer discovery and product marketing.

=== Books ===
Hellman is the author of the non-fiction book, Intentional Leadership and the several fiction novels, including Cyphers & Sighs, Write to Die, Turn Around & Die.

== Awards ==
- 2010 - Vistage: Rookie of the Year
- 2012 - Tech Cocktail (now Tech.co) Reader Poll: #1 Angel Investor in the United States
