= Linda Findley =

American business executive

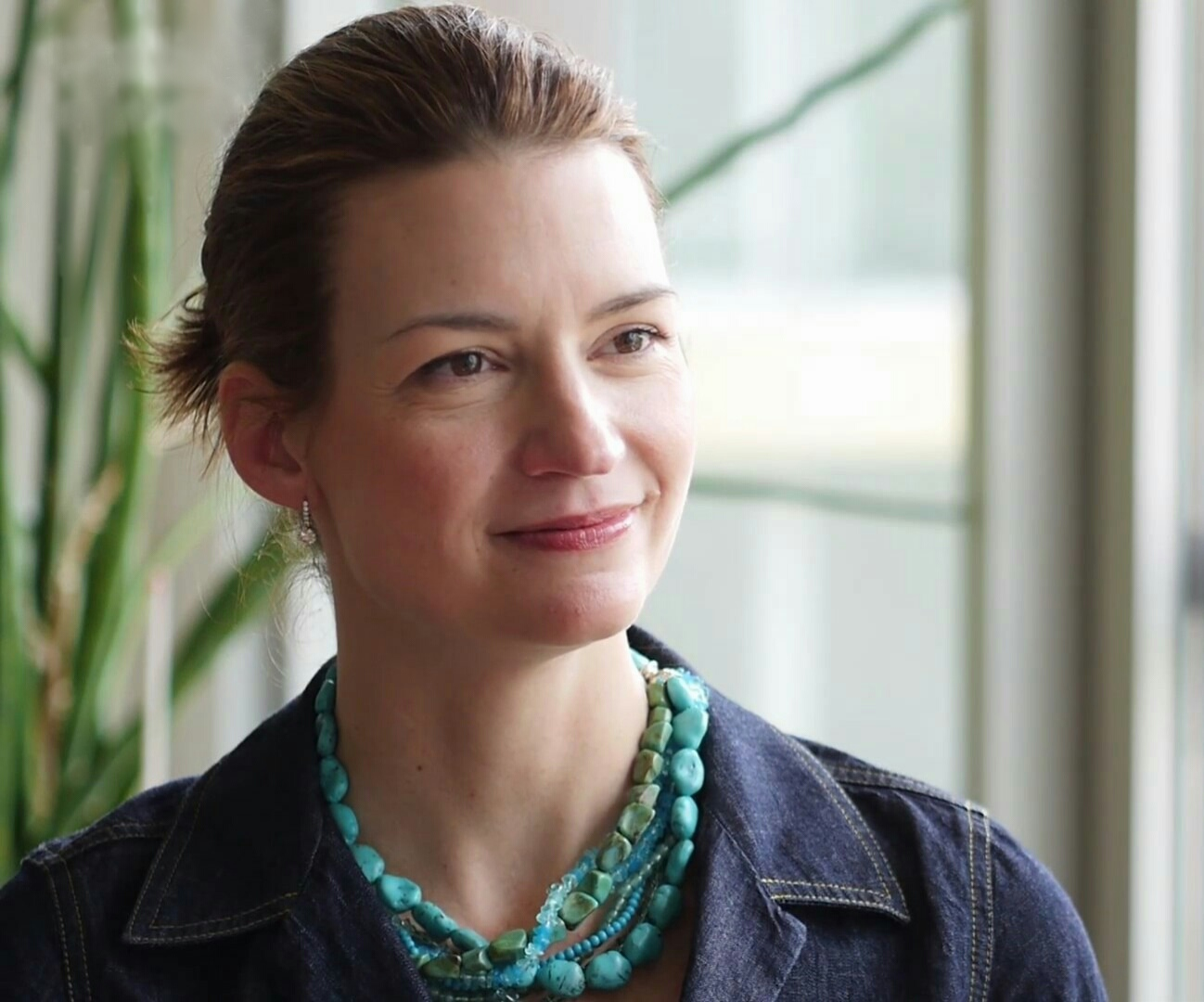
- Findley in 2015
- Born: North Carolina, U.S.
- Education: BA, Elon College; MA, UNC-Chapel Hill
- Known for: CEO, Blue Apron

Linda Findley is the CEO of Blue Apron, a meal kit delivery service. {{Disputed}}

== Early life and education ==
Findley grew up in North Carolina. She received a bachelor's degree from Elon College and a Master of Arts degree from the University of North Carolina at Chapel Hill.

== Career ==
Findley began her career in Hong Kong managing global marketing and business development at the Alibaba Group. She worked at Evernote for three years and served as chief operating officer until leaving the role in 2015.

Findley was the Chief Operating Officer of Etsy from May 2016 to May 2019. In May 2019, after stepping down from Etsy, she joined Blue Apron as the new CEO of the company. As of May 2019, she also serves on the Board of Directors of Ralph Lauren among others.
