= Matt Salzberg =

American businessman

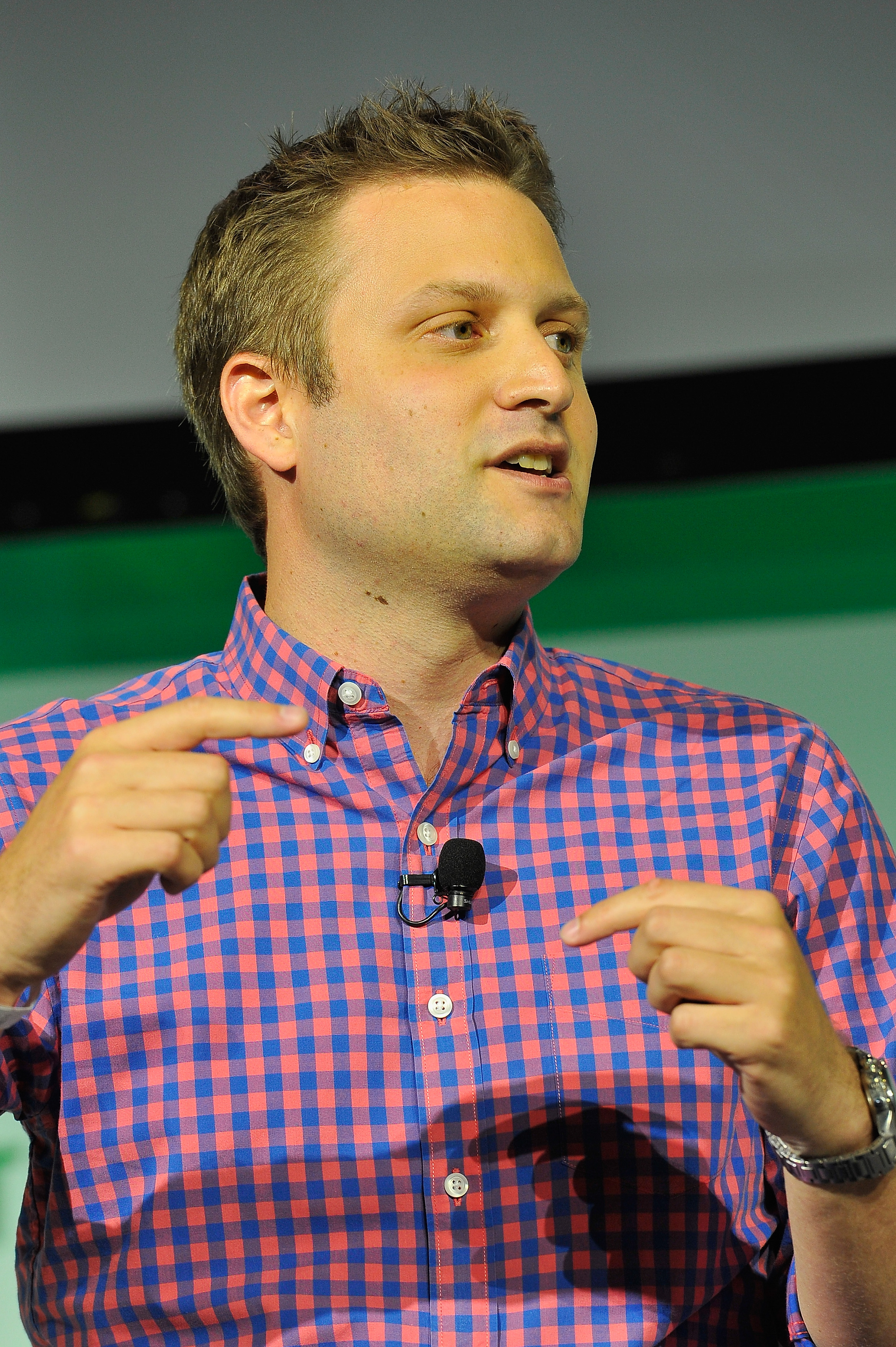
- Matt Salzberg at TechCrunch Disrupt in 2014
- Born: 1983 or 1984 (age 41–42); United States
- Occupations: Businessman and entrepreneur
- Known for: Co-founding Blue Apron (where he was CEO)
- Spouse: Lily Hayes Salzberg (m. 2014)

Matt Salzberg (born 1983 or 1984) is an American businessman and entrepreneur, known for co-founding Blue Apron (where he was CEO), Embark Veterinary and Suma Brands. He is currently founder and managing partner at Material, a venture fund focused on systematic company creation opportunities.

== Early life, education and family ==
Salzberg grew up in Edison, New Jersey and attended J. P. Stevens High School where he graduated as valedictorian.

He received his AB in economics at Harvard University in 2005, where he served as president of the Sigma Chi fraternity, and graduated summa cum laude. In 2010, he received his MBA from Harvard Business School.

He is married to Lily Hayes Salzberg.

== Career ==
Salzberg started his career as an investor in private companies, first as an analyst in The Blackstone Group’s private equity group from 2004-2008, and then as a senior associate at Bessemer Venture Partners, a venture capital firm, from 2010-2012.

In 2012, Salzberg developed the idea for Blue Apron, an e-commerce business centered around home cooking, and nationwide recipe and ingredient delivery. He recruited two co-founders to join him and served as CEO from 2012 to 2017. During his tenure as CEO, the company grew from a concept to over 5,000 employees, $910 million in revenue.

As CEO, Salzberg emphasized the opportunity to use business for social good, including partnering with food banks to distribute millions of pounds of food to the hungry, signing on as an amicus in Obergefell v. Hodges (the U.S. Supreme Court case which established the right to gay marriage), committing the company to become part of EPA’s “Food Loss and Waste 2030 Champions,” partnering with Michelle Obama’s Let’s Move initiative to promote healthy eating for children, and favoring suppliers with sustainable and regenerative practices.

In 2017, Salzberg took Blue Apron public, raising $300m in its Initial Public Offering then served as chairman from 2018 to 2021. In September 2021, Salzberg and RJB Partners LLC invested $33m in Blue Apron as a private placement, and RJB Partners backstopped a rights offering at a 158% premium to the prior day’s closing stock price. As part of that transaction, Blue Apron agreed to additional ESG initiatives including: achieving carbon neutrality, enacting a $15 minimum wage, and implementing new board diversity goals.

Salzberg also co-founded Embark Veterinary, a genetic testing company for dogs, with Ryan Boyko and Adam Boyko, and has served on the board of directors since 2015. In 2021, Embark raised $75m from Softbank, valuing the business at $700m.

In 2019, Salzberg launched Material, a venture capital fund focused on systematic company creation opportunities. He has co-founded and serves as Chairman at Suma Brands.

== Honors, awards and organizations ==
- Member, Phi Beta Kappa
- 35 under 35 by Inc. Magazine
- 40 under 40 by Fortune
- 40 under 40 by Crain's
- 2016 E&Y Entrepreneur of the Year national award
- Entrepreneur in Residence at Harvard Business School
