= Computer Age Management Services =

Indian mutual fund transfer agency

Computer Age Management Services Limited
- Type: Public company
- Traded as: NSE: CAMS; BSE: 543232
- Industry: Fintech
- Founded: 1988
- Headquarters: MGR salai, Nungambakkam, Chennai, Tamil Nadu, India
- Key people: Anuj Kumar (CEO); Ramcharan Sesharaman (CFO)
- Products: Services to Mutual Funds, Payment Services, Services to Private Insurance Companies, Alternate Investment Fund, Banks & NBFCs, CAMS Insurance Repository, Account Aggregation Services, KYC Services, Central Recordkeeping Agency for National Pension Scheme (NPS)
- Number of employees: 8300
- Website: www.camsonline.com

Computer Age Management Services Limited (CAMS) is a mutual fund transfer agency serving Indian asset management companies. The company was incorporated in 1988 and is headquartered in Chennai. It became publicly listed in October 2020, subsequent to an initial public offering (IPO) through an offer by its existing shareholders.

== History ==
CAMS was founded in early 1988 by V Shankar working in software development and computer education.

During Y2K, CAMS pivoted to domestic financial services.

The Indian financial services industry experienced a renaissance in the period 1997/8-2006/7, with changes in regulation, products, and supporting infrastructure. Financial businesses started taking advantage of technology and networking, and CAMS entered what became platform-based services. In 2000 HDFC Group invested in CAMS. In early 2014 India's Stock Exchange (NSE), took a position in the company.

CAMS started off with of 20 staff and started to process transfer agency operations during the late eighties. CAMS handled IPOs including IPCA Laboratories, Wockhardt Ltd, NCD issues of RPPL, RPEL, and Crossland Research Labs Ltd. CAMS processed the first-ever allotment of Ford Escorts, launched in 1996 by Ford India Pvt Ltd.

With the advent of closed-end Mutual Funds, CAMS was involved in the processing of the Indian Bank Mutual Fund and later started to handle the operations of Alliance Capital Mutual Fund. This was CAMS' first open-end mutual fund. CAMS handled the oldest Indian Mutual Funds, such as JM Mutual Fund, ITC Threadneedle, Zurich India Mutual Fund, Sun & FC Mutual Fund, Dundee Mutual Fund, and Taurus Mutual Fund.

CAMS got listed on the BSE on October 1, 2020, following an initial public offering (IPO). It later made its formal debut on the NSE on May 7, 2021.

CAMS Financial Information Services Private Limited (CAMS FIS), a wholly-owned subsidiary of CAMS, operates as an RBI-licensed Account Aggregator under the brand name CAMS finserv.

== Edge360 ==
Edge360 is a distributor portal maintained by CAMS that enables financial and non-financial transactions for Independent Financial Advisors, their employees, and Registered Investment Advisors. Most financial transactions can be completed using the portal. Some non-financial transactions are supported, such as changing contact details of the investor, changing of bank mandate, and registration. Distributors can also download statements, and a variety of WBR reports to run their daily business. The portal allows mutual fund distributors to run campaigns and initiate KYC for their investors digitally.

== Operations ==
As of June 2020, CAMS offeres varied services to the mutual fund, insurance, and banking industries through its network of over 270 locations across India.

As of April 2025, CAMS serves as a Registrar and Transfer (RTA) for approximately 68% of the average assets under management (AAUM) in the Indian mutual fund industry.

As of March 2026, CAMS operates six back-office locations across Chennai, Coimbatore, and Hyderabad, supported by three data centers configured for near-disaster recovery (in Chennai) and far-disaster recovery (in Mumbai). The company's service delivery network includes over 285 customer service centers across India, with a total workforce exceeding 8,300 personnel (including outsourced staff).

== Subsidiaries ==
CAMS Repository Services Ltd (CAMSRep) is licensed by IRDA to provide insurance repository services.

CAMS Financial Information Services Pvt Ltd (CAMSfinserv). CAMSfinserv conducts account aggregation services in India.

CAMS Investor Services Pvt Ltd ("CAMS KRA") is a SEBI registered KYC Registration Agency (KRA) providing KYC registration services and maintains KYC investor records, on behalf of registered capital market intermediaries, eliminating the need to repeat KYC.

Sterling Software Pvt Ltd is a subsidiary software provider of CAMS for Mutual Fund industries. Sterling serves the requirements of Mutual Funds, Asset Management Companies, Fund Distributors and intermediaries. Its products rely on Oracle Databases with Microsoft .NET Platform and Internet front ends.

== Memberships, associations, accreditations ==
CAMS is the founding member of the Registrars Association of India (RAIN) which was founded in 1991. RAIN is a representative body of Registrars and Share Transfer Agents in India.

CAMS is a member of The National Association of Software and Services Companies (USA). CAMS is an ISO 9001 – 2008, ISO 27001 compliant organization complies with SOC 1 & 2 (UTC) standards Service Organization Controls.
