= Ben Beach =

American editor and runner

Bennett "Ben" Hastings Beach (born May 23, 1949) is an American writer-editor and recreational distance runner who holds the record for most consecutive completed Boston Marathons (50 on April 17, 2017). He and Johnny (The Elder) Kelley share the record (17) for the most Boston Marathons run in under 2 hours and 40 minutes. Kelley finished 58 Boston Marathons between 1933 and 1992 but not consecutively. Beach, who has completed 76 26-mile races including 16 Marine Corps Marathons, is the only person to have run every Cherry Blossom Ten-Mile Race, which was established in 1973.

== Running ==
Beach grew up in Mount Kisco, New York and began running at 16. After listening to a live radio broadcast of the Boston Marathon when he was a senior at Governor Dummer Academy in Byfield, Massachusetts, he decided to enter the race in 1968 when he was a Harvard freshman and had reached the event's minimum age of 18. At the time the race, which numbered just over 1,000 participants, was limited to males and had no qualifying standards. "I remember I was completely unprepared," said Beach. "I really didn't have any idea how you prepare for one of those things."

Beach finished his debut marathon in 3 hours, 23 minutes and 50 seconds and has raced in Boston every year since. "I didn't embark on this with any sense that I would do this for the rest of my life," said Beach, whose top placement was 34th in 1985 and best time was 2:27:26 in 1981.

Beach, whose fastest clocking at the distance is 2:26:29 at the 1981 New York City Marathon, won the Midnight Sun Marathon in Fairbanks, Alaska in 1976 and the Gettysburg Marathon in 1978.

Beach reached the top of the list of what Boston Marathon organizers call 'streakers' in 2013 after longtime leader Neil Weygandt opted not to enter. His bid to break the record of 45 in a row was aborted that year when the twin terrorist bombings near the finish line on Boylston Street prompted officials to halt the race. Though Beach was prevented from continuing just before he reached Kenmore Square, approximately a mile from the finish, the Boston Athletic Association later ruled that runners who had reached the midway point when the event was stopped would be considered to have finished.

While his times have slowed significantly due to dystonia, a movement disorder that began to damage his stride in 2002, Beach perennially has been able to finish before the official six-hour cutoff. "It's a part of me at this point," he said. "And it's something to challenge me. I just want to keep going."

== Writing ==
Beach, who began his career as sports editor of the Harvard Crimson, has earned his living primarily as a writer and editor. He has worked for Congressman Lucien N. Nedzi (D-Mich.), Time, USA Today, The Wilderness Society and for a contractor for the State Department's Bureau of Conflict and Stabilization Operations. He earned a B.A. in economics from Harvard College in 1971 and a J.D. from Catholic University of America in 1978.
