= Family Life (novel) =

2014 autobiographical novel by Akhil Sharma

- US hardback edition
- Author: Akhil Sharma
- Language: English
- Genre: Autobiographical novel
- Publisher: W. W. Norton & Company
- Publication date: April 7, 2014
- Publication place: United States
- Media type: Print (hardback and paperback); Digital (ebook)
- Pages: 224 (US hardback edition)
- Awards: Folio Prize (2015); International Dublin Literary Award (2016)
- ISBN: 978-0-393-06005-8

Family Life is a 2014 autobiographical novel by Akhil Sharma. Set in 1978, it tells the coming-of-age story of an eight-year old Indian boy named Ajay Mishra living with his recently immigrated family in New York City. The story develops around his older brother Birju, who suffers a life-changing accident, and how the family copes with the incident.

This was Sharma's second published novel. It won the 2015 Folio Prize and the 2016 International Dublin Literary Award.
