= An Obedient Father =

2000 novel by Akhil Sharma

- Author: Akhil Sharma
- Language: English
- Publication date: 2000

An Obedient Father is a 2000 novel by Akhil Sharma. It received the 2001 Hemingway Foundation/PEN Award and Whiting Writers' Award. Set during the assassination of Indian Prime Minister Rajiv Gandhi, the story is about a corrupt and loathsome bag man who lives with his daughter and granddaughter in a New Delhi slum. The novel started as a short story that was previously published.

In his interview for the Paris Review's series "My First Time", Sharma described creating his main character as "looking for someone who was guilty appropriately... There's that Henry James quote that 'it doesn't matter if a character is good or bad, it matters if the character is interesting.' So that's how I began to figure how to write about someone like (the main character)."

In July 2022, McNally Editions published a considerably revised, shorter edition of the novel, with a very different ending.
