= William G. Eggington =

William Gregory Eggington (born 1950) was Ludwig-Weber-Siebach Humanities Professor (2013–2018) in the Linguistics and English Language Department, College of Humanities at Brigham Young University. He is a native of Australia. From 2007 to 2013, he was chair of the Linguistics and English Language Department. During the 2013–2014 academic year, he was a visiting scholar at Kyung Hee University, Global Campus, Suweon, South Korea. Prior to joining the Brigham Young University faculty in 1989, Eggington was on the faculty of the Northern Territory University in Australia.

Eggington has a BA from Brigham Young University-Hawaii in English and Teaching English as a second language with secondary teaching credentials. He has an MA in Linguistics from the University of Southern California which is also where he received his Ph.D.in Linguistics.

He has been an editor of such works as Directions in Applied Linguistics (along with Paul Bruthiaux, Dwight Atkinson, William M. Grabe, Vaidehi Ramanathan) which was published by Multilingual Matters in 2005, The Sociopoliticis of English Language Teaching published in 2000 by the same publisher, Language Policy: Dominant English, Pluralist Challenges published by John Benjamins Publishing Company in 1997 and Language: Maintenance, Power and Education in Australian Aboriginal Contexts. Much of Eggington's early work focused on aboriginal culture and linguistics in Australia.

Eggington was a consultant on language issues at the 1996 Atlanta Olympics, the 2000 Sydney Olympics and the 2002 Salt Lake City Olympics. He served as an elected member of the board of directors of TESOL from 2003 to 2006. and chaired TESOL's 2005 Annual Convention at San Antonio.

Eggington is also a forensic linguist specializing in linguistic approaches to addressing legal matters such as non-native English speakers' interactions with the legal system, authorial attribution, trade name dilution, ambiguities in contract language, and matters involving language in hate crimes.
