= Center for Advanced Media Studies =

The Center for Advanced Media Studies (CAMS) is multi-disciplinary, specialised research centre that aims to study the influences on the communication of ideas in the media. It is part of the Department of German and Romance Languages and Literatures at Johns Hopkins University in Baltimore, Maryland. The center organizes workshops, conferences, lectures, screenings and overall supports the study of the rapidly growing field of advanced media study through fellowships and artist residences.

The Center for Advanced Media Studies' core function is to promote both research in advanced media theory and the practice of traditional and new media to explore the dynamic relationship that media and humans share. Media study has advanced over the last century from a convergence of cultural studies, critical theories and philological disciplines focusing on the historical, linguistic and cultural analysis of how an idea is communicated. CAMS has been the host of conferences that include media theorists such as Tom Gunning and Thomas Elsaesser. Bernadette Wegenstein, a Research Professor and documentary film maker, is the director of CAMS. The center works closely with the Maryland Institute College of Art, the Baltimore Museum of Art and is open to graduate students interested in media.
