= Ken Powell =

American businessman (born 1954)

- Born: c. 1954; Denver, Colorado, U.S.
- Education: Harvard University; Stanford Graduate School of Business
- Occupation: Businessman
- Known for: Former chairman and CEO of General Mills
- Board member of: Medtronic, Inc. Board of Regents (University of Minnesota)
- Spouse: Wendy Bennett

Kendall J. Powell (born c. 1954) is an American businessman. He is the former chairman of General Mills from 2008 to 2017, and chief executive officer (CEO) from 2007 to 2017.

== Early life and education ==
Powell was born circa 1954 in Denver, Colorado. He graduated from Harvard University in 1976, and three years later earned an MBA from the Stanford Graduate School of Business.

== Career ==
Powell joined General Mills in 1979. He subsequently held a variety of management positions at the company. From 1999 to 2004, he was CEO of Cereal Partners Worldwide, a joint venture between General Mills and Nestlé. In 2005, he was appointed as the company's U.S. retail unit chief. In May 2006, he was promoted to president and chief operating officer. In September 2007, Powell was appointed as General Mill's CEO, then chairman of the board of directors in the following year. He retired in 2017.

Powell serves on the board of directors of Medtronic, Inc. and on the Board of Regents of the University of Minnesota.

== Compensation ==
As CEO of General Mills in 2009, Powell received total compensation of $9,221,035, which included a base salary of $959,583, a cash bonus of $1,910,770, stocks granted of $3,720,566, options granted of $2,276,223, and other compensation of $353,893. His 2011 total compensation of $8,609,199 included a base salary of $973,042, a cash bonus of $1,926,622, stocks granted of $3,724,528, options granted of $1,705,426, and other compensation of $278,981.

== Personal life ==
Powell is married to Wendy Bennett. They have two daughters.
