= Akhil Sharma =

American novelist (born 1971)

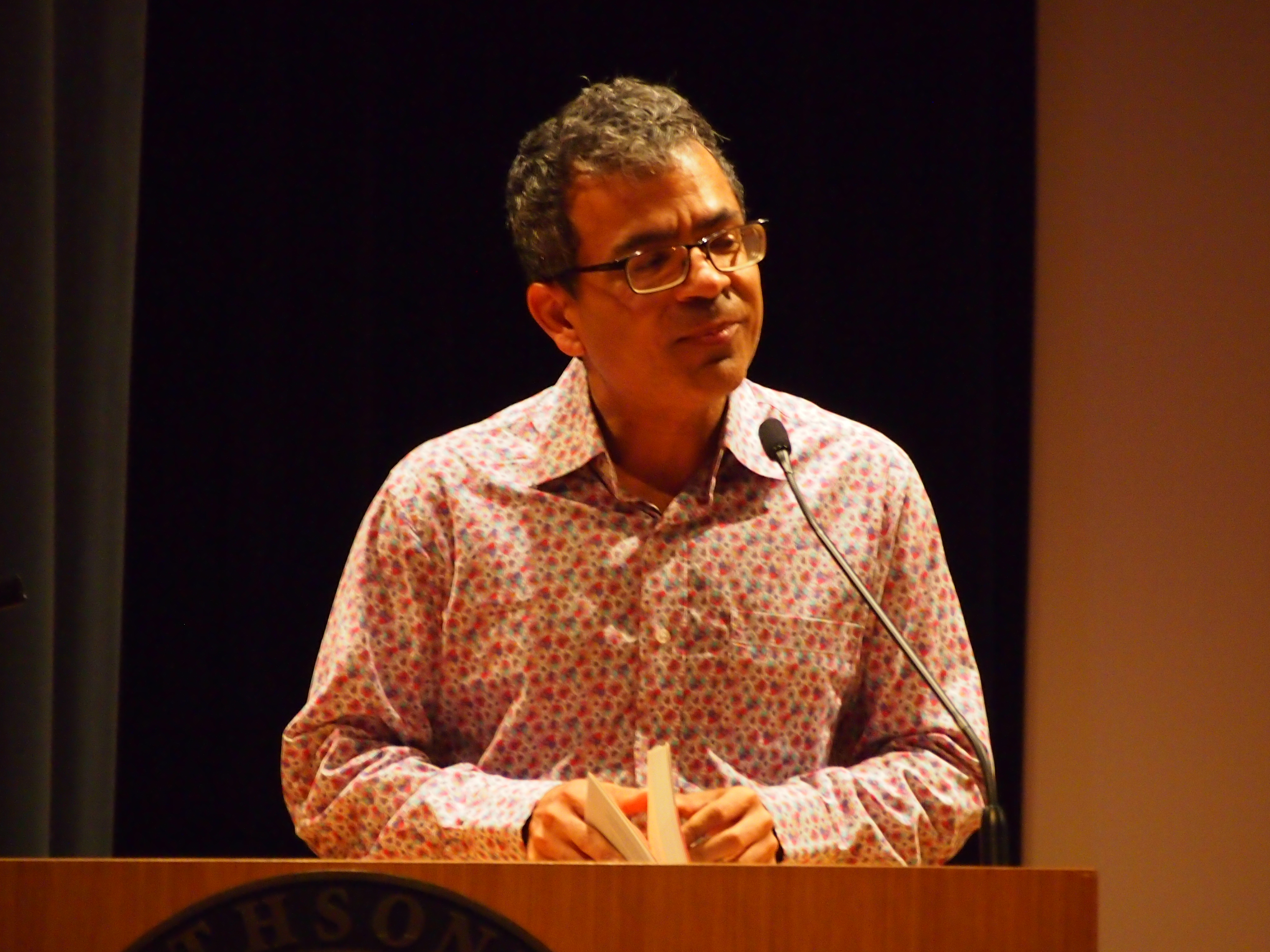
- Akhil Sharma
- Born: 22 July 1971 (age 55); Delhi, India
- Education: Princeton University (BA); Stanford University; J.P. Stevens High School
- Occupations: Novelist, professor
- Writing career
- Notable works: An Obedient Father (2000); Family Life (2014)
- Notable awards: Hemingway Foundation/PEN Award (2001); Folio Prize (2015); International Dublin Literary Award (2016)

Akhil Sharma (born July 22, 1971) is an Indian-American author and professor of creative writing. His first published novel An Obedient Father won the 2001 PEN/Hemingway Award. His second, Family Life, won the 2015 Folio Prize and 2016 International Dublin Literary Award.

== Early life ==
Born in Delhi, India, he immigrated to the United States when he was eight, and grew up in Edison, New Jersey, where he graduated from J. P. Stevens High School. Sharma described experiencing racism in school and in the city: "people cursing at us in the street, and being spat at at school." Sharma's teenage brother was in a pool accident that left him in a thirty-year coma, an incident that forms the basis of Sharma's semi-autobiographical novel, Family Life. Sharma studied at Princeton University, where he earned his B.A. in public policy at the Woodrow Wilson School. While there, he also studied under a succession of notable writers, including Russell Banks, Toni Morrison, Joyce Carol Oates, Paul Auster, John McPhee, and Tony Kushner. He then won a Stegner Fellowship to the writing program at Stanford, where he won two O. Henry Awards (1995 and 1997). He then attempted to become a screenwriter, but, disappointed with his fortunes, left to attend Harvard Law School.

Sharma went on to become an assistant professor in the creative writing MFA program at Rutgers University-Newark.

== Career ==
Sharma has published stories in The New Yorker, The Atlantic Monthly, The Quarterly, Fiction, the Best American Short Stories anthology, and the O. Henry Award Winners anthology. His short story "Cosmopolitan" was anthologized in The Best American Short Stories 1998, and was also made into a 2003 film of the same name, which has appeared on the PBS series Independent Lens.

Sharma's first novel was An Obedient Father for which he won the 2001 Hemingway Foundation/PEN Award. Sharma's second novel, Family Life was published by W. W. Norton & Company in the U.S. and Faber and Faber in the U.K. in April 2014. The New York Times described the semi-autobiographical novel as "deeply unnerving and gorgeously tender at its core.". David Sedaris noted that "[e]very page is alive and surprising, proof of [Sharma’s] huge, unique talent." Sharma wrote about the 13 years it took to write Family Life in an essay on The New Yorker's website. Family Life won the 2015 Folio Prize for fiction and the 2016 International Dublin Literary Award.

He shares office space with the writers John Wray, Isaac Fitzgerald, and Alice Sola Kim. He and Wray had previously been part of an informal writing group that includes Gary Shteyngart, Suketu Mehta, and Ray Isle.

In July 2017, Norton published Sharma's collection of short stories, A Life of Adventure and Delight.

== Personal life ==
Sharma and his first wife, Lisa Swanson, met in law school and married in 2001. They later divorced. In 2020, Sharma married Irish psychologist Christine Mulligan, with whom he has a daughter.

== Bibliography ==
=== Novels ===
- An Obedient Father (2000)
- Family Life (2014)

=== Short story collection ===
- A Life of Adventure and Delight (2017)

=== Short stories ===
Title	Year	First published	Reprinted/collected	Notes
"The Blue Umbrella Man"	1990	Sharma, Akhil (Summer 1990). "The Blue Umbrella Man". The Quarterly (14): 153.		
"A Heart Is Such a Heavy Thing"	1997	Sharma, Akhil (November 30, 1997). "A Heart Is Such a Heavy Thing". The New Yorker.	A Life of Adventure and Delight	
"Prosperity"	2000	Sharma, Akhil (June 11, 2000). "Prosperity". The New Yorker.	excerpt of An Obedient Father	
"Surrounded By Sleep"	2001	Sharma, Akhil (December 2, 2001). "Surrounded By Sleep". The New Yorker.	A Life of Adventure and Delight and basis of A Family Life	
"Mother and Son"	2007	Sharma, Akhil (Spring 2007). "Mother and Son". Granta. 97.	excerpt of A Family Life	Granta 97 theme: 'Best of Young American Novelists 2'
"We Didn't Like Him"	2013	Sharma, Akhil (June 3, 2013). "We Didn't Like Him". The New Yorker. Vol. 89, no. 16. pp. 56–61.	A Life of Adventure and Delight	
"A Mistake"	2014	Sharma, Akhil (January 12, 2014). "A Mistake". The New Yorker.	excerpt of A Family Life	
"A Life of Adventure and Delight"	2016	Sharma, Akhil (May 16, 2016). "A Life of Adventure and Delight". The New Yorker.	A Life of Adventure and Delight	
"You Are Happy?"	2017	Sharma, Akhil (April 10, 2017). "You Are Happy?". The New Yorker.	A Life of Adventure and Delight	
"The Narayans"	2024	Sharma, Akhil (August 26, 2024). "The Narayans". The New Yorker.		

=== Non-fiction ===
- Sharma, Akhil (November 4, 2013). "Butter". Take Out. The New Yorker. Vol. 89, no. 35. p. 55.
- Sharma, Akhil (July 12, 2017). "Why I Hate My Best Short Story". Personal History. The New Yorker.
- Sharma, Akhil (January 24, 2022). "A Passage to Parenthood". Personal History. The New Yorker.

== Awards and honours ==
- 2001 PEN/Hemingway Award winner for An Obedient Father
- 2001 Whiting Award winner for An Obedient Father
- 2014 New York Magazine Ten Best Books of the Year selection for Family Life
- 2014 New York Times Ten Best Books of the Year selection for Family Life
- 2015 Folio Prize winner for Family Life
- 2016 DSC Prize for South Asian Literature shortlist for Family Life
- 2016 International Dublin Literary Award for Family Life
