= Bernadette Wegenstein =

Austrian media theorist

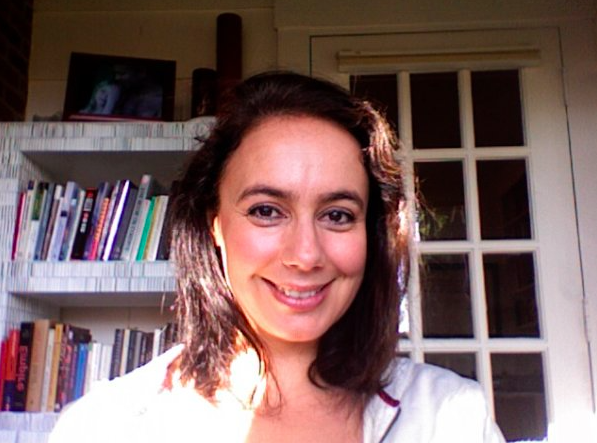
- Born: 1969 (age 56–57)
- Education: University of Vienna
- Occupations: Tenured Professor and Director, Center for Advanced Media Studies, Johns Hopkins University
- Writing career
- Genre: Nonfiction
- Subject: Media theory

Bernadette Wegenstein (born 1969) is an Austrian media theorist who is a research professor and director of the Center for Advanced Media Studies at Johns Hopkins University. She has written books on media theory including Getting Under the Skin: Body and Media Theory, The Cosmetic Gaze: Body Modification and the Construction of Beauty.

== Education ==
She received a doctorate from University of Vienna in 1998 with a thesis "Die Darstellung von Aids in den Medien : semio-linguistische Analyse und Interpretation" ("The portrayal of AIDS in the media: linguistic semiotic analysis and interpretation") Copies of the thesis are held in WorldCat libraries. she subsequently became an assistant professor at the University of Buffalo.

== Career ==
Wegenstein is a professor at the Johns Hopkins University, where she also directs the Center for Advanced Media Studies.

She produced and directed her first documentary Made Over in America (Icarusfilms) about a television makeover show The Swan (TV series) in 2007. Her second film, See You Soon Again, which she co-directed with Austrian director and producer Lukas Stepanik (The Cinema Guild, 2012) is a portrait of Viennese Holocaust survivor Leo Bretholz in his efforts to pass on his story of survival to the Baltimore youth. The Good Breast (2016) is a feature documentary that interweaves the intimate stories of three breast cancer patients with the history and mythology of the breast. The Conductor (2021) is a Emmy-nominated documentary about Marin Alsop, the first woman appointed to lead a major American orchestra. Devoti Tutti (2023) is a neo-realist exploration of Saint Agatha of Sicily who was martyrized by her breast sacrifice in 251 AD.

In her book The Cosmetic Gaze she analyzes the body as a medium of the gaze. This medium is best exemplified in Reality TV makeover shows, such as The Swan where contestants are made over and revealed with drastic changes.

== Bibliography ==
=== Books ===
2025 Jane Campion: Philosophical Filmmaker, London and New York: Bloomsbury

2021 Radical Equalities and Global Feminist Filmmaking — an Anthology, together with Lauren Benjamin Mushro, Vernon Press

- Wegenstein, Bernadette (2012). The cosmetic gaze: body modification and the construction of beauty. Cambridge, Massachusetts: MIT Press. ISBN 9780262232678. According to WorldCat, the book is held in 284 libraries.
  - Review: Uden, Eline van (May–June 2013). "The cosmetic gaze: Body modification and the construction of beauty, Bernadette Wegenstein. MIT Press (2012), (240 pages. ISBN 0262232677. ISBN 978-0262232678)". Women's Studies International Forum. 38: 151–152. doi:10.1016/j.wsif.2013.02.007.
- Wegenstein, Bernadette (2006). Getting under the skin the body and media theory. Cambridge, Massachusetts: MIT Press. ISBN 9780262232470. According to WorldCat, the book is held in 964 libraries
  - Review: Nicholas, Lucy (August 2007). "Book Review: Bernadette Wegenstein. Getting Under the Skin: Body and Media Theory. London: MIT Press, 2006, xxii plus 211 pages, £24.95. ISBN 0 262 23247 2 (hbk)". Convergence. 13 (3): 325–326. doi:10.1177/13548565070130030804. S2CID 144308195.
  - Review: Shipka, Jody (2007). "Getting Under the Skin: Body and Media Theory, Bernadette Wegenstein (Cambridge: MIT P, 2006. 211 pages)" (PDF). Convergence. 27 (3–4). JAC: 862–866. JSTOR 20866820. Archived from the original (PDF) on 2015-04-02.

=== Book chapters ===
- Wegenstein, Bernadette (2009), "Making room for the body: From fragmentation to meditation (nonfiction)", in Flanagan, Mary (ed.), re:skin, Cambridge, Massachusetts London: MIT Press, pp. 81–102, ISBN 9780262512497.
- Wegenstein, Bernadette (2010), "Body", in Mitchell, W. J. T.; Hansen, Mark B. N. (eds.), Critical terms for media studies, Chicago London: The University of Chicago Press, pp. 19–34, ISBN 9780226532660.

=== Journal articles ===
- Wegenstein, Bernadette (Spring 2002). "Getting under the skin, or, How faces have become obsolete". Configurations. 10 (2): 221–259. doi:10.1353/con.2003.0018.
- Wegenstein, Bernadette (27 August 2011). "Recently edited: Cosmetic surgery: Medicine, culture, beauty" (blog). bernadettewegenstein.com.
