= Ghen Maynard =

Ghen Maynard is a television producer and Senior Executive Vice President, Alternative Programming, at CBS Studios. Maynard played a key role in the introduction of European reality shows to the American television market.

== Early career ==
In 1988, Maynard received a degree in psychology from Harvard University and pursued a career in publishing at Houghton Mifflin Company.

It was as a post-production coordinator at ABC Productions that Maynard began in television. Maynard joined CBS's drama department as an assistant in 1995, then manager in 1997, helping to develop such series as CSI: Crime Scene Investigation.

== Reality TV ==
Maynard's championing of the reality series Survivor led to his promotion to head of CBS's nascent alternative programming department, where he is credited with developing The Amazing Race, the US version of Big Brother and UPN's America's Next Top Model. Maynard ultimately rose to the level of Senior Vice President, Alternative Programming & Creative Strategies at CBS before leaving for NBC in 2004 to become head of development for scripted programming.

After two years as Executive Vice President, Primetime Development, NBC Entertainment, Maynard returned to CBS to take oversight of the alternative programming and new media content departments for CBS, as well as alternative programming for the CW Television Network and CBS Paramount Network Television, CBS Corporation's television production studio. But after shows such as Greatest American Dog, Armed & Famous, Secret Talents of the Stars failed to garner ratings, Maynard was let out of his CBS contract 10 months early in 2008. Soon after, CW's senior vice president of alternative programming Jennifer Bresnan took on the role of CBS's senior vice president of alternative programming.

== After CBS ==
In August 2011, Maynard placed 54th in the WPT Legends of Poker event. He cashed out with $700.
