= Elizabeth Scarlett =

American academic and author

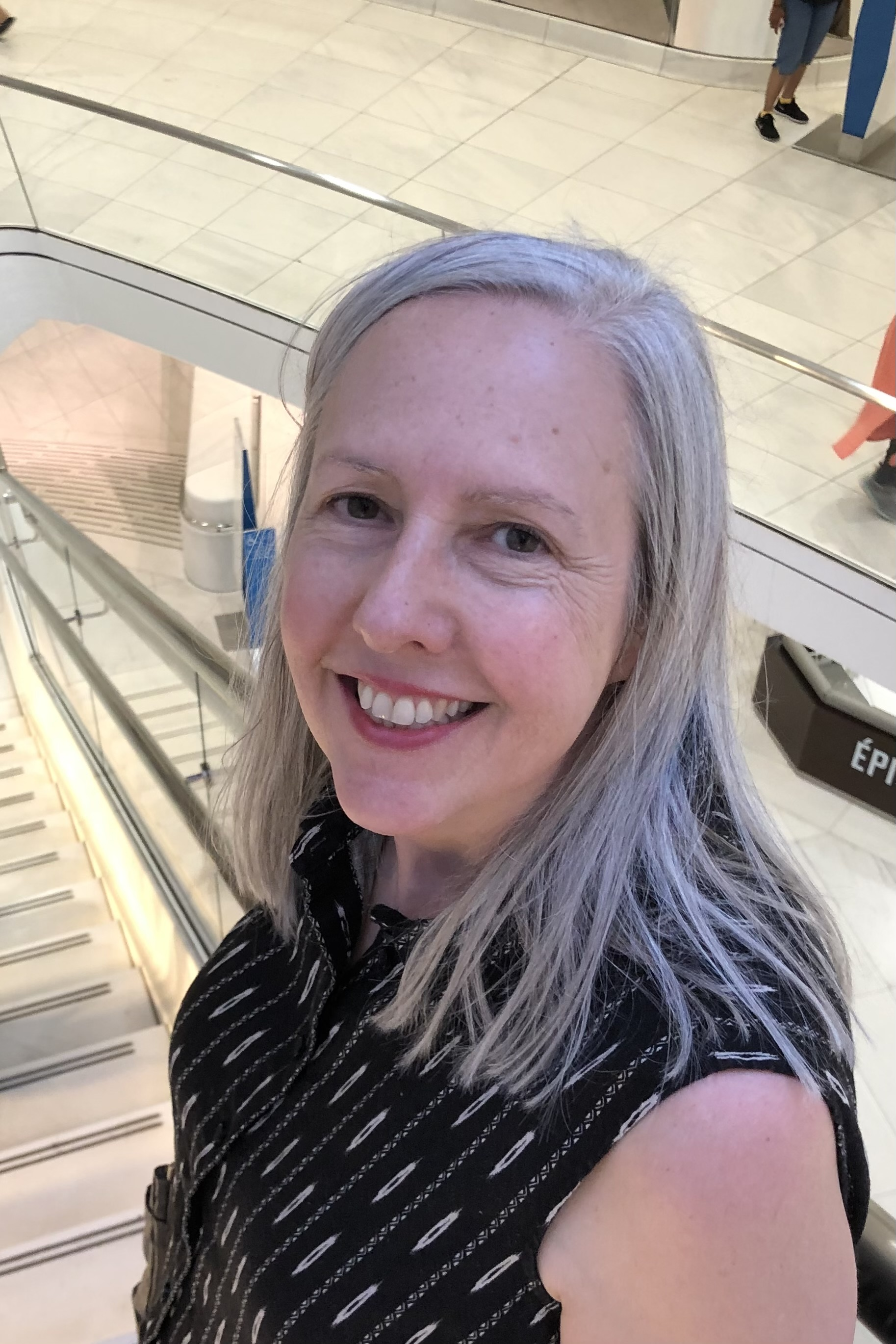

Elizabeth A. Scarlett (Brooklyn, April 11, 1961) is an American academic and writer. She is a Spanish professor in the Department of Romance Languages & Literatures at the University at Buffalo of the State University of New York. She completed her undergraduate degree in Comparative Literature at Washington University in St. Louis, and her graduate degrees at Harvard University. She was a Fulbright Foreign Language Teaching Assistant in 1983–84 in Carcassonne, France, and was an exchange student in 1988–89 at the University of Seville, Spain.

The Cervantes Institute lists her among the major figures in Hispanic studies in the United States. Her first book, Under Construction: The Body in Spanish Novels (University Press of Virginia, 1994) was selected for the 1995 Outstanding Academic Books List by Choice magazine. Her second sole-authored book is Religion and Spanish Film: Luis Buñuel, the Franco Era, and Contemporary Directors (University of Michigan Press, 2014). She also co-edited (with Howard B. Wescott) the collection Convergencias Hispánicas: Selected Proceedings and Other Essays on Spanish and Latin American Literature, Film, and Linguistics (Juan de la Cuesta Hispanic Monographs, 2001). She has published numerous critical essays in refereed journals and peer-edited volumes in North America and in Europe. Her literary criticism is based on narrative theory and feminism. Her work on film "combines auteurist study with genre analysis" and accentuates the persistence of Catholic imagery and themes in Spanish cinema.

== Free Full-Text Works ==
• "Martyrs and Saints of the Spanish Civil War Era: Enshrinement of the Right and Historical Memory." Rite, Flesh, and Stone: The Matter of Death in Contemporary Spanish Culture (1959-2020). Edited by Daniel García Donoso and Antonio Cordoba. Nashville: University of Vanderbilt Press, 2021, pp. 97–118 [access to the Table of Contents and Introduction to the volume].

• "RECording the End Time in Twenty-First-Century Spanish Film." Writing in the End Times: Apocalyptic Imagination in the Hispanic World. Edited by David R. Castillo and Bradley J. Nelson. Hispanic Issues On-Line (HIOL) vol. 23, 2019, pp. 184–205.

• "Luis Buñuel: Introduction," "Luis Buñuel: Overviews" Oxford Bibliographies: Cinema and Media Studies. Edited by Krin Gabbard. Oxford, U.K.: Oxford University Press, 2016.

• "Introduction: God and the Spanish Director." Religion and Spanish Film: Luis Buñuel, the Franco Era, and Contemporary Directors. Ann Arbor: University of Michigan Press, 2014, pp. 1–20.

• Religion and Spanish Film: Luis Buñuel, the Franco Era, and Contemporary Directors. Ann Arbor: University of Michigan Press, 2014.

• "Pedro Almodóvar and the Professions: The Case of La piel que habito." MIFLC Review vol. 16, 2012–2014, pp. 81–92.

• Convergencias Hispánicas: Selected Proceedings and Other Essays on Spanish and Latin American Literature, Film, and Linguistics. Edited by Elizabeth Scarlett and Howard B. Wescott. Newark, DE: Juan de la Cuesta, 2001. Homenajes, no. 18.

• "Pascual Duarte y los asesinos en serie." Actas del XII Congreso de la Asociación Internacional de Hispanistas. Vol. 5. Edited by Derek Flitter. Birmingham, U.K.: University of Birmingham and Doelphin Books, 1998, pp. 250–256.

• "Conversación con Antonio Muñoz Molina." España Contemporánea vol. 7, no. 1, Spring 1994, pp. 69–82.

• "Introduction." Under Construction: The Body in Spanish Novels. Charlottesville: University Press of Virginia, 1994, pp. 1–9.

• Under Construction: The Body in Spanish Novels. Charlottesville: University Press of Virginia, 1994.
