= Blue Apron =

Meal delivery service

Blue Apron Holdings, Inc.
- Company type: Subsidiary
- Traded as: NYSE: APRN (2017–2023)
- Founded: August 2012; 14 years ago
- Headquarters: New York City, New York, U.S.
- Area served: United States
- Founders: Matt Wadiak; Matt Salzberg; Ilia Papas
- Industry: Meal kit
- Revenue: ▼US$458 million (2022)
- Employees: 165 (2023)
- Parent: Wonder Group (2023–present)
- Subsidiaries: Blue Apron Market; BN Ranch
- Website: www.blueapron.com

Blue Apron Holdings, Inc. is an American ingredient-and-recipe meal kit company headquartered in New York City, operating its services exclusively in the United States. It offers weekly boxes containing ingredients, which also includes suggested recipes that must be cooked by hand by the customer using the pre-ordered ingredients.

As of September 2016, the company had shipped 8 million meal servings. In June 2017, the company went public through an initial public offering. Since November 2023, Blue Apron operates as a subsidiary of food delivery startup Wonder Group.

== History ==
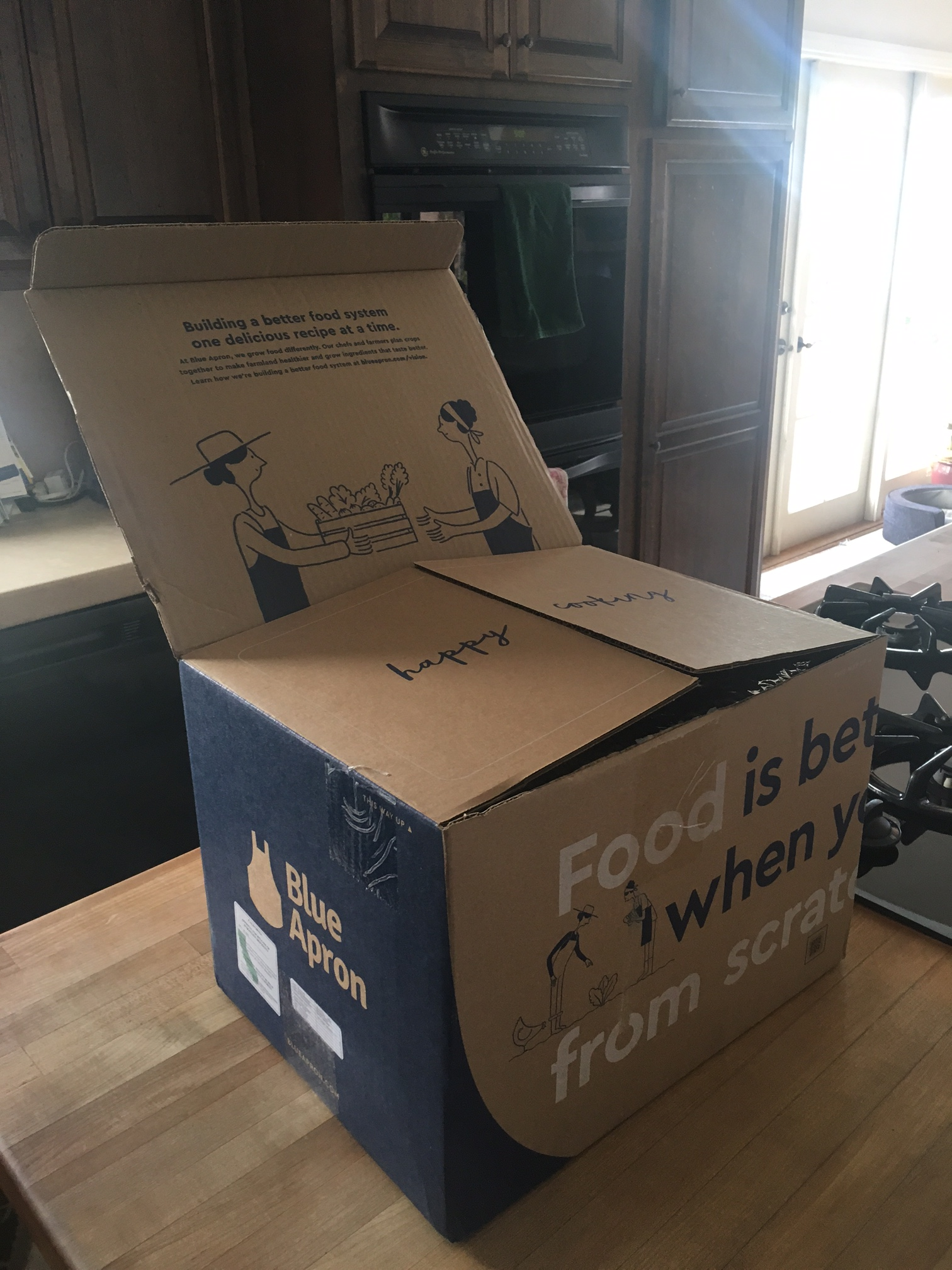
Blue Apron meal kit shipping box

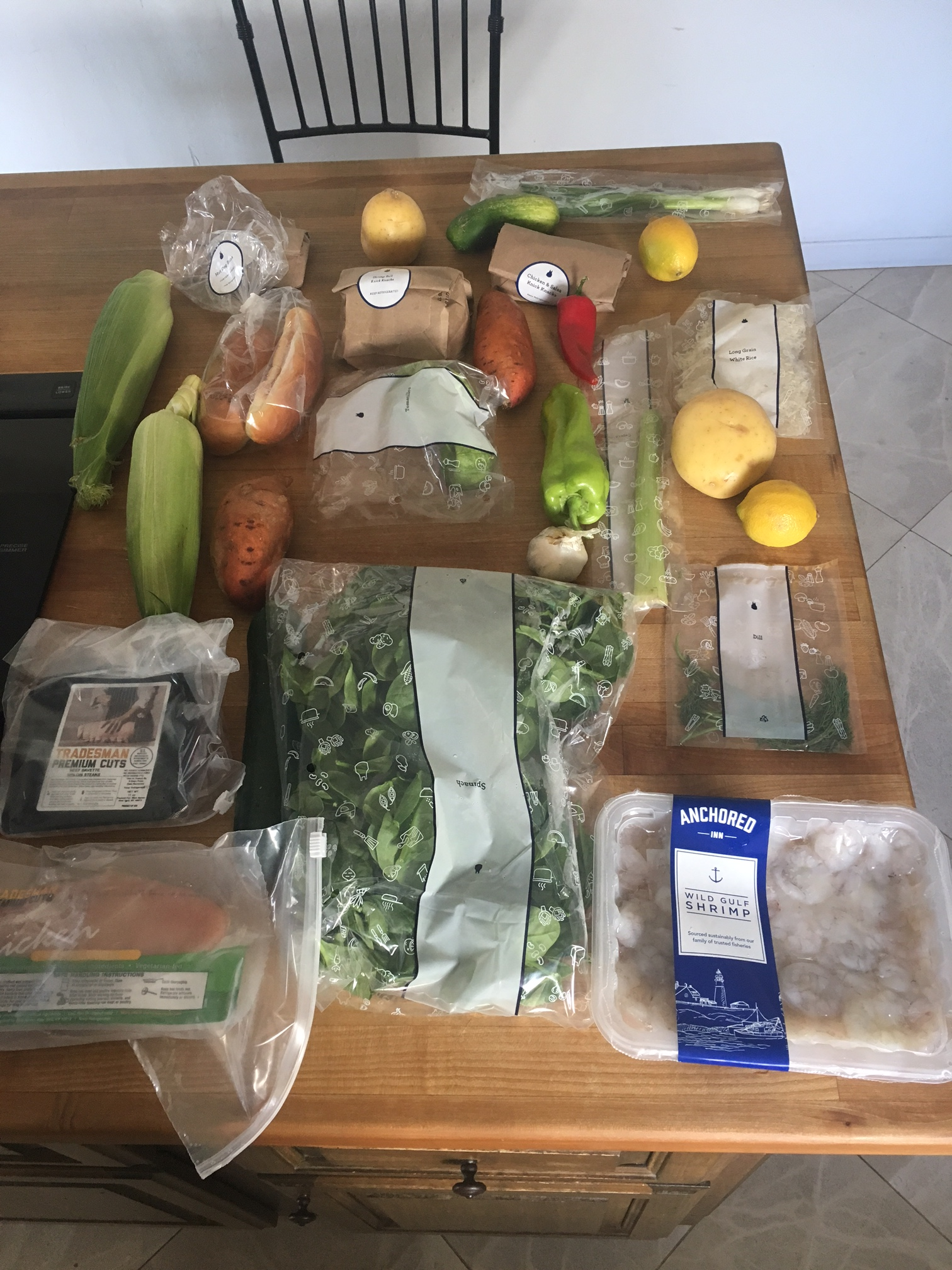
Blue Apron meal kit ingredients

Matt Salzberg, Ilia Papas and Matt Wadiak first began sending customers boxes containing the ingredients to cook recipes in August 2012, packing and shipping the first 30 orders themselves from a commercial kitchen in Long Island City. In May 2014, the company announced that it would be launching a fulfillment center in Richmond, California. In November 2014, Blue Apron launched Blue Apron Market, a store featuring kitchen tools and cookware. In December 2014, the company opened another fulfillment center in Jersey City, New Jersey.

After the opening of its third fulfillment center in Arlington, Texas in June 2015, the company began shipping to the contiguous United States.

In September 2015, Blue Apron launched Blue Apron Wine, a direct-to-consumer wine delivery service that sends customers six 500 ml bottles per month. The wines, made specifically for Blue Apron, are purchased directly from vineyards and sent directly to customers.

In October 2016, BuzzFeed reported a history of safety and health violations at the company's Richmond, California distribution center. The company attributed the problems to operational issues while scaling up during its early days.

In February 2017, the company announced that it would be opening a fulfillment center in Linden, New Jersey.

On June 29, 2017, Blue Apron had its initial public offering of 30 million shares of class A common stock (ticker APRN) priced at $10 per share; it is the first U.S. meal-kit company to go public.

Since going public, Wall Street has cut Blue Apron's stock price in half. By October 2017, prior to its next earnings report, the company had announced a company-wide realignment, 6% of employees laid off at both the corporate offices and fulfillment centers, estimated to be a couple of hundred jobs.

On November 30, 2017, Blue Apron announced that Brad Dickerson would be replacing Salzberg as CEO; Salzberg will remain chairman.

As of March 26, 2018, Blue Apron has lost 81.4% of its market value since its initial public offering.

In May 2018, Blue Apron began selling 4 servings meal kits at 17 Costco locations in California, marking the company's entrance into physical retail and Tim Bensley, formerly of Acosta Sales & Marketing, entered as CFO.

On August 2, 2018, Blue Apron, announced the total number of customers who paid for a meal delivery had a decrease of 24 percent during the second quarter of 2018 compared to the previous quarter, and the company also indicated total orders had slipped by 23 percent.

In April 2019, Brad Dickerson was succeeded by Linda Findley Kozlowski as the new CEO of the company. However, Dickerson remained at the company as an adviser.

In November 2020, Alan Blake was succeeded by Charlean Gmunder as the new COO. Blake left the company in June to lead operations at Kettle Cuisine.

In September 2023, food delivery startup Wonder Group agreed to acquire the company for $103 million, which was finalized couple of months later.

In 2026, Blue Apron introduced a more flexible ordering model, allowing customers to purchase meals without a subscription. The company also expanded its weekly menu to over 100 options, including customizable recipes, ready-made meals, and "assemble and bake" dishes. Delivery times were reduced to as little as three days.

In April 2026, Blue Apron's fulfillment operations, owned by FreshRealm, filed for Chapter 11 bankruptcy protection with plans to sell its assets and settle a recall that began in June 2025. Blue Apron's fulfillment operations will be sold to Misfits Market, with plans to continue operating during the procedure. Blue Apron's remaining assets and operations are not expected to be affected by the bankruptcy filing.

== Environmental impact ==
The company and other meal kit companies have been criticized for creating excess packaging waste from the individually packaged ingredients. As of 2017, Blue Apron partners with farms that limit agricultural chemicals and promote soil health through crop rotation to grow specialty crops for the company.
