= Luke McGarry =

British illustrator

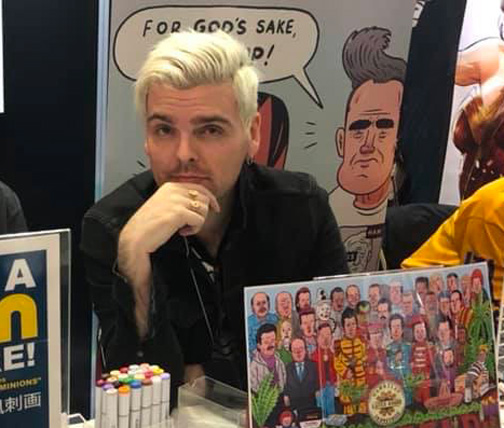
- McGarry at Tokyo Comic Con 2018
- Born: Luke Edward McGarry; 11 October 1987 (age 38); Manchester, England
- Education: Orange County High School of the Arts
- Occupations: Cartoonist; illustrator; animator; designer; musician
- Years active: 2005–present
- Known for: FYF Fest, Festival Supreme
- Partner: Jillian Bell
- Parent: Steve McGarry
- Relatives: Joe McGarry
- Website: lukemcgarry.com

Luke Edward McGarry (born 11 October 1987) is a British illustrator, cartoonist, animator and designer based in Los Angeles. He is engaged to actress Jillian Bell.

== Early career ==
In 2005, while they were still students at the Orange County High School of the Arts, Luke and his brother, Joe McGarry – twin sons of British cartoonist Steve McGarry – formed the music duo Pop Noir. Luke's design work for the band, including posters and record sleeves, led to him being invited to create cartoons and illustrations for a number of music-related publications, including LA Record, LA City Beat and OC Weekly. In 2007, in recognition of their design work for The National Cartoonists Society, the 19-year-olds became the youngest-ever recipients of the NCS Silver T-Square, an award whose previous recipients include two U.S. Presidents and cartoonists Milton Caniff, Mort Walker and Bil Keane. Luke McGarry has subsequently been nominated eight times in the NCS Silver Reuben Division Awards, winning three times, for Advertising Illustrator of the Year in 2016, 2019 and 2020

== Music business projects ==
In 2010, McGarry began his seven-year association with FYF Fest, creating the poster art each year, as well as designing printed programs, maps and wristbands for the Festival. During this period, he regularly collaborated with House of Vans and created poster art for a number of Los Angeles music venues and promoters, including Spaceland, The Echo, Echoplex and The Regent. In 2013, OC Weekly described McGarry as "the poster child for success in the world of rock-n-roll cartoons".

McGarry was the lead visual artist for Festival Supreme, an annual Los Angeles comedy and music festival, created by Jack Black and Kyle Gass of Tenacious D, which was staged from 2013 to 2017. In addition to posters, stage design and backdrops, projections and merchandising art, in 2015 he also collaborated with his brother to create a series of five 30-second animated TV commercials, sponsored by Geico, which ran on the IFC network. Operating as The Fantastic Heat Brothers, they wrote, designed, and animated the series, with voiceovers provided by Black and Gass.

Beginning in 2014, McGarry began creating posters and billboards for the annual series of Coachella-adjacent shows staged by the festival's promoter, Goldenvoice.

He has designed a number of record sleeves for other artists, from Kim Fowley to a Secret 7" project for Underworld, and created animated music videos for a diverse range of music artists including:

- The Macaroons – "Billy's Bagel", 2009
- Guster – "This Is How It Feels To Have A Broken Heart", 2010
- Desaparecidos – "Golden Parachutes", 2015
- Hoodie Allen – "Sushi", 2017

In 2020, he released his debut solo single, "Black Leather" b/w "Go Ghost" on the Fantastic Heat label, accompanied by two animated music videos.

== Cartoons, animation and MAD magazine ==
Inspired by the death of Han Solo in 2015's Star Wars: The Force Awakens, McGarry began creating a series of Sad Chewie cartoons depicting Chewbacca in everyday situations mourning the loss of his friend.

In 2016, he collaborated with LA Galaxy on a poster series. He also made his debut in a number of publications, including The Hollywood Reporter, Canadian Business and Le Parisien. He provided a regular political cartoon, as well as a number of front covers, for OC Weekly.

In 2017, he launched the comic Lukey McGarry's TLDR on GoComics.

He also became a regular contributor to MAD in 2017, creating two regular features for the magazine – "The 27 Club" and "The Chancers" – as well as contributing numerous single cartoons and panels.

The McGarrys have continued to produce animated videos for a variety of clients. In 2017, they created the "Melania's Great Escape" series for Super Deluxe. In 2019 they produced an animated segment for Vice's Party Legends series. Other animation clients have included Google Play, Visa and Universal Music Group.

Much of Luke's cartoon output is published directly to social media and focuses on pop culture and politics. Boing Boing has described his work as "hilarious" and "deeply niche."

== Cartoon festival, convention appearances and live shows ==
McGarry has been featured at San Diego Comic-Con on a number of occasions, including 2013, when he and Jack Black staged a special signing session on the convention floor. The following year, the pair were reunited and joined by Kyle Gass for a special appearance, once more hosted by the National Cartoonists Society. In 2018, McGarry was featured in MAD magazine panels at SDCC, New York Comic Con and Wondercon in Anaheim.

2016 saw him featured as special guest, alongside his cartoonist father, Steve McGarry, at The Lakes International Comic Art Festival in Kendal, U.K. The pair returned as guests for each of the three subsequent festivals and Luke McGarry and his brother, Joe, were featured when The Lakes was staged as a fully virtual online event in 2020. Among the events they conducted for LICAF 2020 were an animation masterclass and music sessions alongside their invited guests, The Walking Dead artist Charlie Adlard, David Silverman of The Simpsons and Batman illustrator Michael Lark. The McGarry brothers also created Sheep Trek, a virtual comic that combined the talents of Luke McGarry, Duncan Fegredo, Steven Appleby, Rick Stromoski, Steve McGarry, Craig Gleason, Johnny Sampson, Tom Richmond, Lucie Lomová, Charlie Adlard, Bill Morrison, Sean Phillips, Michael Lark, Francis Desharnais, Jibé and Alex A. Luke McGarry did a live show broadcast from Los Angeles and the brothers also created the festival's Virtual Clocktower website.

In April 2017, McGarry moderated Drawing the Lines, a political cartoons panel discussion with Tom Tomorrow and David Horsey at The Los Angeles Times Festival of Books at USC.

In May 2017, Luke, Joe and Steve McGarry, as well as MAD magazine cartoonist Tom Richmond, were invited speakers at the China-U.S. Comics Summit Forum at the Jilin Animation Institute in Changchun, where they were honored as visiting professors.

That same year, Luke McGarry appeared at Los Angeles Comic Con and was a special guest at three events in Tokyo – Tokyo Comic Con, Tokyo International Comic Festival (Kaigai Manga Festa) and Comic Art Tokyo. He returned to Tokyo Comic Con in 2018 as a featured guest.

In 2018, he was a featured guest at the Helsinki Comics Festival in the Helsinki Kattilahalli.

In 2019, after appearing at C2E2 in Chicago, and Wondercon in Anaheim, he appeared as a special guest at Québec BD in Canada before appearing once more at SDCC.

Commissioned to create the look of the inaugural NCSFest in Huntington Beach, California, in the summer of 2019, his work was featured on posters, banners and the shuttle buses laid on by the city to transport attendees. He was featured in seven of the festival's premier events.

He also created the signature artwork for France's Lyon festival in 2019 and was a featured guest at the festival, appearing in numerous events and panels.

He has regularly appeared at "Picture This" improv comedy show's in Los Angeles, San Francisco and Denver. The shows feature comedians paired with cartoonists who live draw as the comedian perform their sets. In 2020, McGarry began to broadcast occasional one hour "Lukey Live in Lockdown" shows via Twitch.

== Exhibitions ==
In 2014, Luke McGarry's work was displayed in a month-long solo exhibition at the Burbank, California, headquarters of Cartoon Network. He has subsequently been featured in a number of exhibitions at L.A.'s Gallery 1988, including shows inspired by Veep, Tom Hanks and Bob's Burgers.

In 2016, his illustrations on the Euro2016 Soccer tournament were featured in the "Group Stage" exhibition hosted by Patterns of Play In Hoxton, London.

In 2017, in tandem with a Pop Noir concert in the brothers' native Manchester, England, 20 of Luke McGarry's concert poster designs were exhibited at The Peer Hat venue in the city centre.

In October 2018, McGarry was the focus of 31 at 31, a month-long exhibition at Carlisle's University of Cumbria that featured 31 of his concert posters to mark his 31st birthday.

His work was heavily featured in the "Playing For A Draw' soccer art exhibition that debuted in the UK in the summer of 2018 at the National Football Museum in Manchester, before it moved to the Brewery Arts Center in Kendal later that year. Playing For A Draw was one of three exhibitions, along with "Hero(ine)s" – a French exhibition which reimagined classic comic characters as female icons – and "90 Years of Popeye," staged concurrently at the Huntington Beach Art Center under the umbrella of "The Wonderful World of Comics" as part of the inaugural NCSFest. McGarry's work was featured in all three exhibitions and he designed all the banners, posters and advertising art for the event.

In June 2019, as part of Lyon BD, he had a one-man exhibition at the city's Kiblind Gallery.

In September 2019, as part of The Lakes International Comic Art Festival, McGarry created the timeline centerpiece of the Let's Go Camping With Tom of Finland exhibition, which charted the history of the Tom of Finland comic series.
