= Hirson =

- Commune
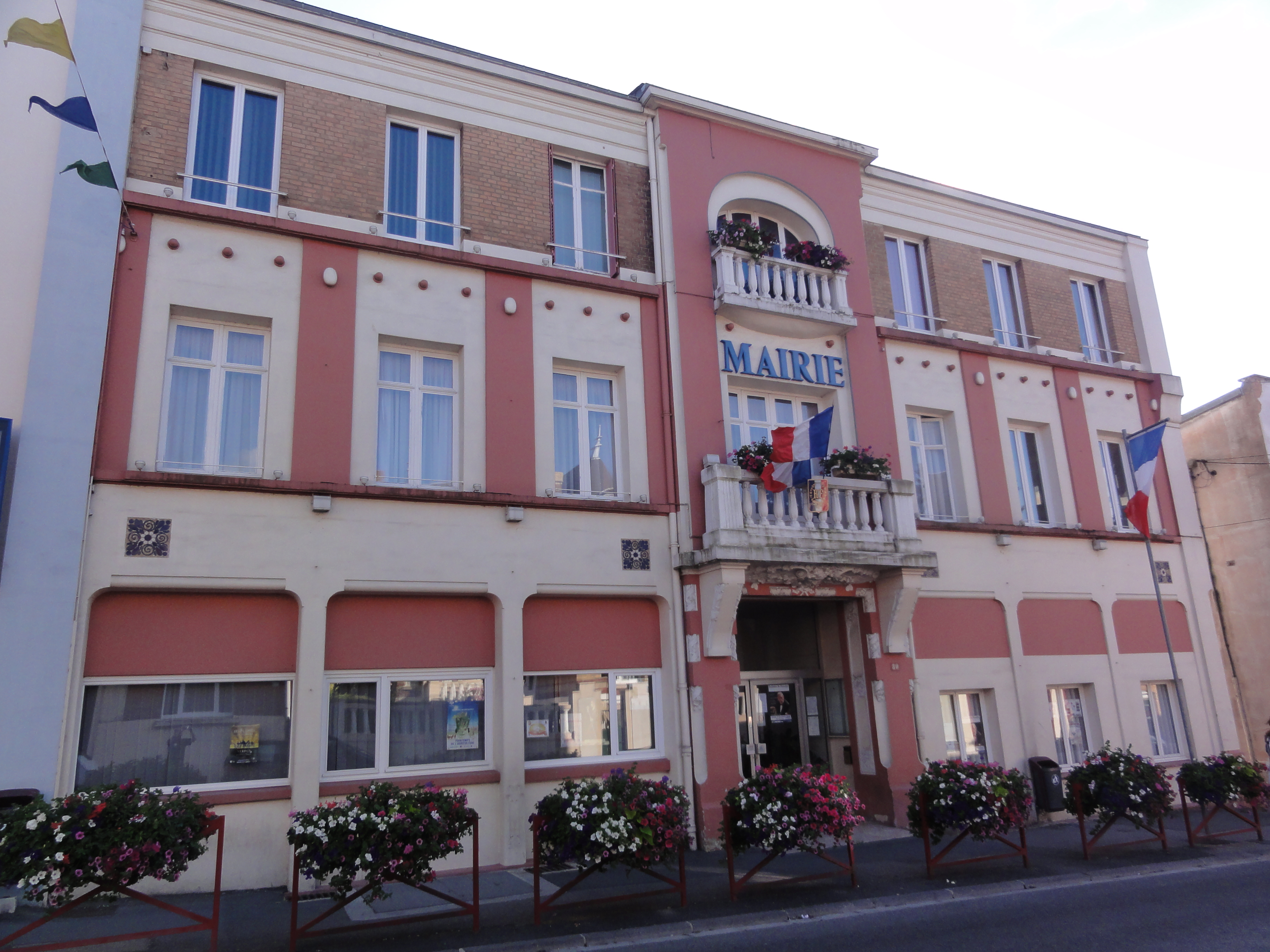
- The town hall of Hirson

- Coat of arms
- Location of Hirson
- Location within France Location within Hauts-de-France
- Coordinates: 49°55′18″N 4°05′02″E
- Country: France
- Region: Hauts-de-France
- Department: Aisne
- Arrondissement: Vervins
- Canton: Hirson
- Intercommunality: CC Trois Rivières

Government
  - Mayor (2026–32): Jean-Jacques Thomas
- Area^{1}: 33.77 km^{2} (13.04 sq mi)
- Elevation: 189 m (620 ft)
- Highest elevation: 268 m (879 ft)
- Lowest elevation: 157 m (515 ft)
- Population (2023): 8,469
  - Density: 250.8/km^{2} (649.5/sq mi)
- Time zone: UTC+01:00 (CET)
  - Summer (DST): UTC+02:00 (CEST)
- INSEE/Postal code: 02381 /02500
- ^{1} French Land Register data, which excludes lakes, ponds, glaciers > 1 km^{2} (0.386 sq mi or 247 acres) and river estuaries.

Hirson (French pronunciation: [iʁsɔ̃]; Picard: Urchon) is a commune in the Aisne department in Hauts-de-France in northern France.

== Geography ==
=== Location ===
Hirson situated among the municipalities of the Aisne

Hirson is adjacent to Belgium. It is located in the northeastern department of Aisne, near the departments of Nord and Ardennes. Hirson is part of Thiérache. It is located near two large forests, the forest of Hirson and the forest of Saint-Michel.

=== Hydrography ===
Hirson is watered by the Oise and Gland. The various streams of the town: stream of Anor, stream of Brugnon, stream of La Marquette, stream of Les Marais, stream of Blangy, stream of Le Catelet, stream of Le Rie De Bon Feu, stream of Four Matot.

=== Geology and Relief ===
The culmination of Hirson is located 268 meters above sea level. The lowest altitude is 157 meters above sea level.

=== Neighboring municipalities ===
Hirson is bordered by eight municipalities: Éparcy, Buire, Neuve-Maison, Mondrepuis, Anor (Nord), Momignies (Belgium), Saint-Michel, Bucilly.

=== Toponymy ===
The name Hirson derives from Latin Iricio meaning hedgehog, or from picard hirchon, of the same meaning.

== History ==
As of the early 20th century, there was a permanent fort and two artillery batteries near the railway junction. Also at that time, the town was engaged in the manufacture of glass bottles, tiles and iron and tin goods, as well as wool-spinning and brewing.

The town is served by the Fives-Hirson railway.

== Population ==
The inhabitants of the town are called Hirsonnais in French.

Historical population

Year	Pop.	±% p.a.
1793	2,023	—
1800	2,144	+0.83%
1806	2,061	−0.66%
1821	2,231	+0.53%
1831	2,718	+1.99%
1836	2,880	+1.16%
1841	3,005	+0.85%
1846	3,140	+0.88%
1851	3,212	+0.45%
1856	3,203	−0.06%
1861	3,224	+0.13%
1866	3,334	+0.67%
1872	3,951	+2.87%
1876	4,445	+2.99%
1881	4,809	+1.59%
1886	5,743	+3.61%
1891	6,294	+1.85%
1896	6,632	+1.05%
1901	7,461	+2.38%

Year	Pop.	±% p.a.
1906	8,541	+2.74%
1911	9,638	+2.45%
1921	9,759	+0.12%
1926	11,344	+3.06%
1931	11,403	+0.10%
1936	11,203	−0.35%
1946	10,462	−0.68%
1954	11,134	+0.78%
1962	11,715	+0.64%
1968	11,858	+0.20%
1975	11,986	+0.15%
1982	11,348	−0.78%
1990	10,173	−1.36%
1999	10,337	+0.18%
2007	9,473	−1.09%
2012	9,348	−0.27%
2017	8,813	−1.17%
2023	8,469	−0.66%

Source: EHESS and INSEE (1968-2023)

== Monuments ==
Churches

- Notre-Dame-de-Lourdes, built in 1908.
- Sainte-Thérèse-de-l'Enfant-Jésus, built around 1930; owned by the pianist Kit Armstrong since 2012.

== See also ==
- Communes of the Aisne department
- Alfred Desmasures
