= Edison High School (New Jersey) =

High school in Middlesex County, New Jersey, US

Location
- 50 Boulevard of the Eagles; Edison, Middlesex County, New Jersey 08817; United States; 40.51633°N 74.3891°W

Information
- Type: Public high school
- Motto: What's Great About Edison High
- Established: 1956
- School district: Edison Township Public Schools
- NCES School ID: 340450003324
- Principal: James Falco
- Faculty: 159.9 FTEs
- Grades: 9th-12th
- Enrollment: 2,393 (as of 2024–25)
- Student to teacher ratio: 15.0:1
- Colors: Scarlet and Vegas Gold
- Athletics conference: Greater Middlesex Conference (general); Big Central Football Conference (football)
- Mascot: Edgar the Eagle
- Team name: Eagles
- Accreditation: Middle States Association of Colleges and Schools
- Newspaper: The Eagle's Eye
- Yearbook: Talon
- Website: ehs.edison.k12.nj.us

Edison High School is a four-year comprehensive public high school located in Edison, in Middlesex County, in the U.S. state of New Jersey. The school serves students of many diverse cultures, and is part of the Edison Township Public Schools. The other high school in the district is J. P. Stevens High School. The school is accredited by the Middle States Association of Colleges and Schools Commission on Elementary and Secondary Schools until July 2029.

Most of the Edison High School students come from either Herbert Hoover Middle School or Thomas Jefferson Middle School, though some come from Woodrow Wilson Middle School and John Adams Middle School as part of the STEM Academy.. Additionally, the elementary school students who go to Edison High School are those who went to John Marshall Elementary School, Washington Elementary School, Lincoln Elementary School, Benjamin Franklin Elementary School, Lindeneau Elementary School, and James Monroe Elementary School.

As of the 2024–25 school year, the school had an enrollment of 2,393 students and 159.9 classroom teachers (on an FTE basis), for a student–teacher ratio of 15.0:1. There were 976 students (40.8% of enrollment) eligible for free lunch and 193 (8.1% of students) eligible for reduced-cost lunch.

== History ==
Edison High School opened in 1956 as the district's first secondary school. By the start of the 1957–58 school year, the school was holding double sessions for students in grades seven through ten. J. P. Stevens High School opened in 1964, as part of an effort to alleviate overcrowding at Edison High School that made it the last school in the district that was still holding double sessions in order to accommodate the volume of students.

== Awards, recognition and rankings ==
The school was the 135th-ranked public high school in New Jersey out of 339 schools statewide in New Jersey Monthly magazine's September 2014 cover story on the state's "Top Public High Schools", using a new ranking methodology. The school had been ranked 174th in the state of 328 schools in 2012, after being ranked 169th in 2010 out of 322 schools listed. The magazine ranked the school 177th in 2008 out of 316 schools. The school was ranked 155th in the magazine's September 2006 issue, which surveyed 316 schools across the state.

== Curriculum ==
Edison High School students are required to take four years of English, three (formerly four) years of math, three years of science, three years of history (two of U.S. followed by one of World) and at least two years of a foreign language (selected from Latin, French, Spanish, Mandarin, and starting in 2008, Italian). In addition, attendance at health and physical education classes are required every year. Starting with the Class of 2008, one year of "Career Education and Consumer, Family and Life Skills" such as Foods or Technology Fundamentals is required as well as a year from the "Visual Performing Arts" such as Chorus, Band, Visual Arts, Clothing for Fashion, and Architectural Drawing. EHS has an Honors college preparatory track that features several Advanced Placement (AP) courses.

== Extracurricular activities ==
The school has several bands such as their concert band for their freshmen. The Symphonic Band is for sophomores, juniors and seniors. The Wind Ensemble, Jazz Ensemble, Indoor Percussion Ensemble, and Marching Band.

The Eagle Marching Band performs at all varsity football games. The Eagle Marching band took home two state titles in 2002 and 2003 for their shows the "Rise and Fall of Rome" and "Medusa" which they performed in Group IV Open. In USSBA Group III Open competitions, the Marching Band was undefeated and took home title of first place group III Open at state championships and Northern States Championships in 2006 with their show entitled: Breaking Boundaries: In 2013, they took first place in State as well as National Championships, with their program "Playback". In 2014, they took first place in State as well as National Championships, with their program "The Grind", and they became the first school in the Edison district to win National championships back to back. They won 1st place in state, regional, and national competitions. In 2020, they becoming State and National champions as a USBands Division 3 Band. They also won 1st place in USBands State, NJMBDA State, and USBands National championships.

== Athletics ==
The Edison High School Eagles compete in the Greater Middlesex Conference, which is comprised of public and private high schools located in the Middlesex County area and operating under the supervision of the New Jersey State Interscholastic Athletic Association (NJSIAA). With 1,490 students in grades 10–12, the school was classified by the NJSIAA for the 2019–20 school year as Group IV for most athletic competition purposes, which included schools with an enrollment of 1,060 to 5,049 students in that grade range. The football team competes in Division 5D of the Big Central Football Conference, which includes 60 public and private high schools in Hunterdon, Middlesex, Somerset, Union and Warren counties, which are broken down into 10 divisions by size and location. The school was classified by the NJSIAA as Group V South for football for 2024–2026, which included schools with 1,333 to 2,324 students.

The school participates as the host school / lead agency for a joint ice hockey team with Metuchen High School and J. P. Stevens High School. The co-op program operates under agreements scheduled to expire at the end of the 2023–24 school year.

Baseball

The baseball team won the Central Jersey Group IV state sectional title in 1969 and won the Group IV championship in 1981 (defeating Hackensack High School in the tournament final), 1982 (vs. Hackensack), 1991 vs. (Morris Knolls High School) and 1993 (vs. West New York Memorial). The 1981 team won the Group IV title with a 4–0 win against Hackensack. The 1982 team defeated Hackensack by a score of 4–0 to win their second consecutive Group IV title and run their season record to 25–3. The Eagles won the GMC Red Division championship and won the 2007 Baseball - North II, Group IV state sectional championship with a 10–4 win versus Westfield High School. Edison High plays on a Red and Vegas Gold artificial turf baseball field, constructed in 2020 ata cost of $1.3 million.

Football

The football team won the Central Jersey Group IV state sectional championship in 1976 and 1991 and Group 5 Champion in 2022. The 1976 team won the Central Jersey Group IV state sectional title with a 19–0 win against Woodbridge High School in the championship game, avenging a 7–0 loss to Woodbridge in their Thanksgiving Day matchup. The team won its second (and most recent) sectional title in 1991 with a 20–16 win against Middletown High School North in the championship game; the 1991 team earned consideration from the Courier News as one of "the best in GMC history" During the 2022 Championship run the Eagles came back from 14 points down with less than four minutes left in the Fourth Quarter against archrival North Brunswick. The Eagles scored two touchdowns, one after an on side kick, then went for two but were denied. Now with less than a minute, North Brunswick waved flags and celebrated but Selbin Sabio kicked a second on side kick and Yasko's son Matt drove the team down the field for a game winning field goal by Sabio. That team was coached by EHS's all time winningest coach, Matt Fulham. Eagles won the sectional title avenging a playoff loss from three years earlier against Cherokee High School.

Bowling

The girls bowling team won the overall state championship in 1986–1988, 1992 and 2000. The program's five state titles are the fifth-most of any school in the state.

Softball

The softball team won the Group IV state championship in 1987 (defeating Belleville High School in the final round of the tournament), 1990 (vs. Clifton High School) and 1991 (vs. West Milford High School). The 1987 team finished the season with a record of 23-2 after defeating Belleville by a score of 7–0 to win the Group IV title. NJ.com / The Star-Ledger ranked Edison as their number-one softball team in the state in 1987.

== Administration ==
The school's principal is James Falco. Core members of the school's administration team include the four assistant principals.

== Notable alumni ==
- Gayleatha B. Brown (1947–2013, class of 1964), United States Ambassador to the Republic of Benin
- Michael Campbell (born 1989), wide receiver who played in the NFL for the New York Jets
- Rich Gaspari (born 1963, class of 1981), three-time IFBB Mr. Olympia Runner-up (1986, 1987 and 1988) who was inducted into the IFBB Hall of Fame in 2004
- Omar Maskati (class of 2007), actor known for his roles in Better Call Saul, Unbelievable, and the 2020 movie Evil Eye
- Patrick McDonnell (born 1956, class of 1974), creator of the daily comic strip Mutts
- Robert Pastorelli (1954–2004, class of 1972), actor best known for the seven years he played painter Eldin Bernecky on the television series Murphy Brown
- Walter Perez, weekend morning co-anchor, journalist and weekday reporter for WPVI-TV, the ABC network affiliate in Philadelphia
- Zach Perez (born 1996), professional soccer player who plays as a defender for USL League One club Richmond Kickers
- Susan Sarandon (born 1946, class of 1964), Academy Award-winning actress
- Rick Stromoski (born 1959, class of 1977), artist and creator of the Mullets and Soup to Nutz comic strips
