= Pop Noir =

American indie dancerock duo

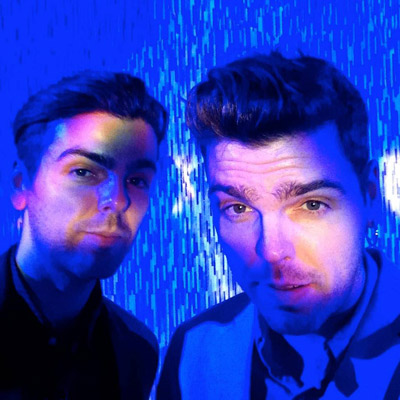
- Pop Noir: Joe and Luke McGarry

Background information
- Origin: Los Angeles, California, U.S.
- Genres: Dance-rock, indie pop
- Years active: 2004–present
- Labels: Fantastic Heat
- Members: Joe McGarry; Luke McGarry
- Website: popnoir.org

Pop Noir is a Los Angeles-based indie dance-rock duo formed by British-born twin brothers Joe and Luke McGarry in 2004, while they were 16-year-old students at the Orange County High School of the Arts. The band began to build a following in the indie clubs of Southern California, and did a brief tour of Europe in late 2006, showcasing at In the City in Manchester, and playing dates in London and Paris.

The band has supported Doves, Sebastien Tellier, The Wombats, The Pinker Tones, A Certain Ratio, Iglu & Hartly, Fitz and the Tantrums and Robyn, and as of late 2015, played more than 300 shows.

Pop Noir has been featured on a number of compilation CDs, including Mr. Shovel's Check One... Two, Volume III, SweetFA3 (a charity album in aid of Joe Strummer's Strummerville), and the original SweetFA compilation, which was given free as a covermount on UK music magazine Artrocker.

The track "Girls of Prey" was released exclusively on RCRDLBL in the summer of 2008, where it debuted in the Top 10, alongside Santigold, Moby and Tokyo Police Club. "Girls of Prey" was featured in the "Extreme" level of the hugely popular iPhone and iPod Touch application Tap Tap Revenge 2, which consistently topped the download charts.

The McGarrys are the sons of cartoonist and illustrator Steve McGarry, who previously designed record sleeves for Joy Division, Slaughter & the Dogs, Jilted John and John Cooper Clarke. The brothers are award-winning designers and illustrators in their own right. In 2007, they became the youngest-ever recipients of prestigious Silver T-Square Awards from the National Cartoonists Society. Previous recipients include Milton Caniff, James Thurber, Mort Walker, Bil Keane, and two U.S. Presidents, Harry S. Truman and Dwight D. Eisenhower. Operating under the name of Fantastic Heat Brothers and primarily designing around the cartoon art of Luke, they have created the ongoing design aesthetic of Tenacious D's Festival Supreme and the annual FYF Fest in Los Angeles and amassed a client list that includes Matador Records, Universal Republic, Myspace and Vans. The brothers have created animated videos for the bands Guster and The Zambonis among others, and in late 2015, IFC began airing a series of Festival Supreme shorts created by the pair. Luke has been featured in a number of art exhibitions in both the U.K. and U.S., including his own month-long exhibition at Cartoon Network, and in 2013, was nominated for the Illustrator of the Year Award from the National Cartoonists Society. He has also twice appeared with Jack Black and Tenacious D at signing events at San Diego Comic Con, in 2013 and 2014.

Pop Noir's debut single "DIY' was released on the Fantastic Heat label on November 16, 2009, and debuted at No. 5 on the FMQB Specialty Radio charts. The video for "DIY" was Spinner.com's Video of the Day, and was voted mtvU's "Freshmen of the Week" in March 2010 following which, the video spent six weeks in rotation on the channel. "DIY" was featured on a number of TV show soundtracks, including episodes of the ABC show The Gates and Fly Girls.

The band played a handful of dates in 2011 and 2012, including a Sold Out show at The Troubadour (West Hollywood, California) in Los Angeles with The Wombats, before re-emerging in January 2013 with their second single on Fantastic Heat, a reworking of New Order's "Temptation". The track debuted at No. 2 on the FMQB Specialty Radio Charts. To coincide with the release, Pop Noir played a month-long residency at The Constellation Room in Santa Ana, California. The accompanying video, which was created, filmed and edited entirely by the brothers themselves, features multi-plane images of Joe playing all the instruments on the track, behind vocalist Luke.

In September 2013, the band's third release, the Jealousy EP on Fantastic Heat, debuted at No. 8 on the FMQB Speciality Radio Charts, tied with Belle & Sebastian and Nine Inch Nails. The video, shot in Los Angeles on location at The Echo, The Standard Hotel and the streets of Downtown LA, was premiered by UK music tastemaker Clash (magazine). To promote the release, Pop Noir headlined The Echo in Los Angeles and played live on numerous local radio stations.

The video for the band's fourth release on Fantastic Heat, "Don't Fool Yourself", premiered on April 30, 2015, with an Artist of the Day feature on Myspace that unveiled a video, shot entirely on a GoPro camera, of the brothers driving the deserted streets of Downtown Los Angeles in the early hours. Released three weeks later, the "Don't Fool Yourself" single debuted at No. 18 on the FMQB Charts and went top 20 on the KKBB Charts. Pop Noir subsequently filmed an acoustic version of the track for the UK'S Student Pocket Guide, along with a cover of QT's single "Hey QT".

In September, 2018, Pop Noir released the single "White Jazz", which debuted in the FMQB Top 20. The accompanying video was shot entirely on location in Tokyo, Japan.

In December, 2023, Pop Noir released the single "New Year's Day", a cover of the 1983 U2 song.

== Discography ==
=== Releases ===
Year	Title	Track listing
2023	New Year's Day: Released: December 15, 2023; Formats: digital download	1. New Year's Day – 5:05
2018	White Jazz: Released: September 1, 2018; Formats: digital download	1. White Jazz – 4:06; 2. White Jazz (Acoustic) – 3:46
2015	Don't Fool Yourself: Released: August 27, 2015; Formats: digital download	1. Don't Fool Yourself – 4:24; 2. Don't Fool Yourself (Instrumental) – 4:21
2013	Jealousy: Released: August 27, 2013; Formats: digital download	1. Jealousy – 4:16; 2. Bang the Drum – 4:36; 3. Thick As Thieves – 3:29; Bang the Drum Slowly – 3:07
2013	Temptation: Released: January 7, 2013; Formats: CD, digital download	1. Temptation – 5:18; 2. Temptation (Radio Edit) – 3:45
2009	DIY: Released: November 16, 2009; Formats: 7" Vinyl, digital download	1. DIY – 3:28; 2. In Like a Lion – 3:28; 3. DIY (DIY Not? Remix) – 3:42 (digital only)
2008	Girls of Prey: Released: June 2008; Formats: digital download	1. Girls of Prey – 3:53
