= Soup to nuts =

"Soup to nuts" is an American English idiom that conveys the meaning of "from beginning to end", derived from the description of a full course dinner. Formal dinners were expected to begin with soup and end with a serving of nuts which signified the end of the meal. This tradition began in the Middle Ages.

Soup to nuts may also refer to:

- Soup to Nuts, a 1930 feature film starring the trio who later became the Three Stooges
- "Soup to Nuts," a 1986 episode of Mama's Family
- "Soup to Nuts" (That's So Raven), a 2006 television episode
- "Soup to Nuts" (Wolf Lake), a 2001 television episode
- Soup2Nuts, a defunct production company known for its animated comedies
- Soup to Nutz, an American comic strip launched in 2000
- NTS Radio, online radio station that uses an abbreviation for Nuts To Soup for its name

== See also ==
- From Soup to Nuts, a 1928 short comedy film starring Laurel and Hardy
- Duck Soup to Nuts, a 1944 Looney Tunes animated short featuring Porky Pig and Daffy Duck
