= John Adams Middle School =

John Adams Middle School may refer to any of several middle schools in the United States:

- John Adams Middle School, Los Angeles, California
- John Adams Middle School, Santa Monica, California
- John Adams Middle School, Mason City, Iowa; see Mason City High School
- John Q. Adams Middle School, Metarie, Louisiana
- John Adams Middle School, Edison, New Jersey
- John Adams Middle School, Albuquerque, New Mexico
- John Adams Middle School, Charleston, West Virginia

In Fiction:

- John Adams Middle School in a Chicago metropolitan area suburb in the movie Bad Teacher
