= Nomi Abadi =

American composer

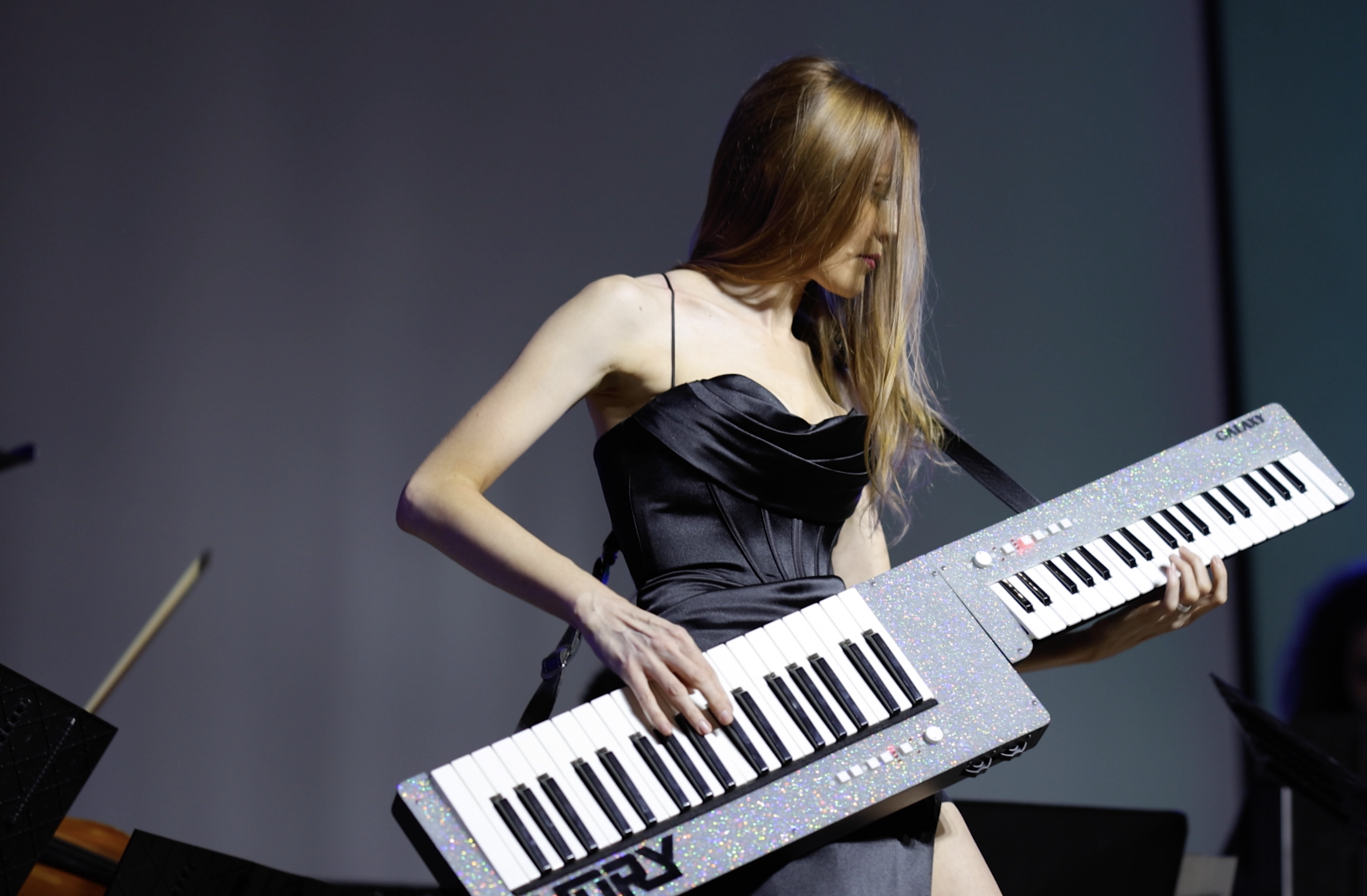

Background information
- Origin: Los Angeles, California, USA
- Genres: Classical; metal
- Website: nomiabadi.com

Nomi Abadi is an American musician, actress, singer, songwriter, and activist known for her work on Marvel's Thunderbolts*.

== Early life ==
Abadi's musical career began with a concert with the Orange County Chamber Orchestra as their youngest soloist at age 5, playing a Mozart concerto. Growing up in Orange County, California, Abadi was homeschooled by her mother and taught piano by her father, the late classical and ragtime pianist Marden Abadi. At age 8, she began professional training in classical piano at the Mannes School of Music after auditioning at Juilliard. She graduated early from the Orange County School of the Arts at age 16 and attended the American Academy of Dramatic Arts.

== Music career ==
Abadi has composed the music for more than thirty films, games, concerts, musical theatre and solo projects. She was a score assistant for the American post-rock band Son Lux on their score for Thunderbolts*. Her composition credits include Sebastian (2023), starring Darius McCrary, and Gothic Springs (2019), starring Peyton List.

Abadi's vocals are featured on Satanic Planet's 2021 self-titled LP release on the track "Devil in Me" featuring the poetry of Satanic Temple founder Lucien Greaves, which she also co-wrote. She played piano on the 2019 album Sekou Andrews and the String Theory which received a Grammy nomination that year in the Best Spoken Word category. Abadi joined String Theory on their following album, The Los Angeles Suite (2020), featuring artists Jens Kuross, SORNE, Shana Halligan, Vōx and Addie Hamilton.

== Discography ==
- 2012: Chase/No Running
- 2015: Nomi Abadi
- 2016: "Omega"
- 2020: "Animals"
- 2023: Heavy Reign

== Activism ==
In 2020, Abadi founded the charity Female Composer Safety League (FCSL), which states that its mission is to provide networking, resources, community, support and allyship to up-and-coming women composers. According to a 2023 article in The Guardian, FCSL was launched after Nomi held two gender safety panels at GameSoundCon and has attracted hundreds of members. The publication stated that "Nomi vowed to expose the toxic, abusive work conditions that run rampant behind the closed doors of soundtrack composing studios".

In 2023, Abadi alleged in a newspaper article that she was sexually harassed from the years 2000 to 2004 by a fellow high school student and her high school teachers.

In 2023, Rolling Stone reported that Abadi had accused composer Danny Elfman of sexually harassing her in 2017. According to the magazine, Abadi and Elfman signed a non-disclosure agreement in 2018, with Elfman agreeing to pay Abadi $830,000 if she did not publicize her allegations against him. Part of the settlement was used to establish the Female Composer Safety League. After Elfman defaulted on payments, Abadi filed a breach of contract suit in Los Angeles Superior Court. On July 10, 2024, Abadi sued Elfman for defamation over claims he made about her in Rolling Stone. The judge denied Elfman's bid to dismiss the suit. In 2026, an appeals court ruled in Elfman's favor, partially overturned the previous court ruling and ordered the case be sent to arbitration.
