= Sainte-Thérèse-de-l'Enfant-Jésus, Hirson =

Church building in Hirson, France

Church of Sainte-Thérèse-de-l'Enfant-Jésus
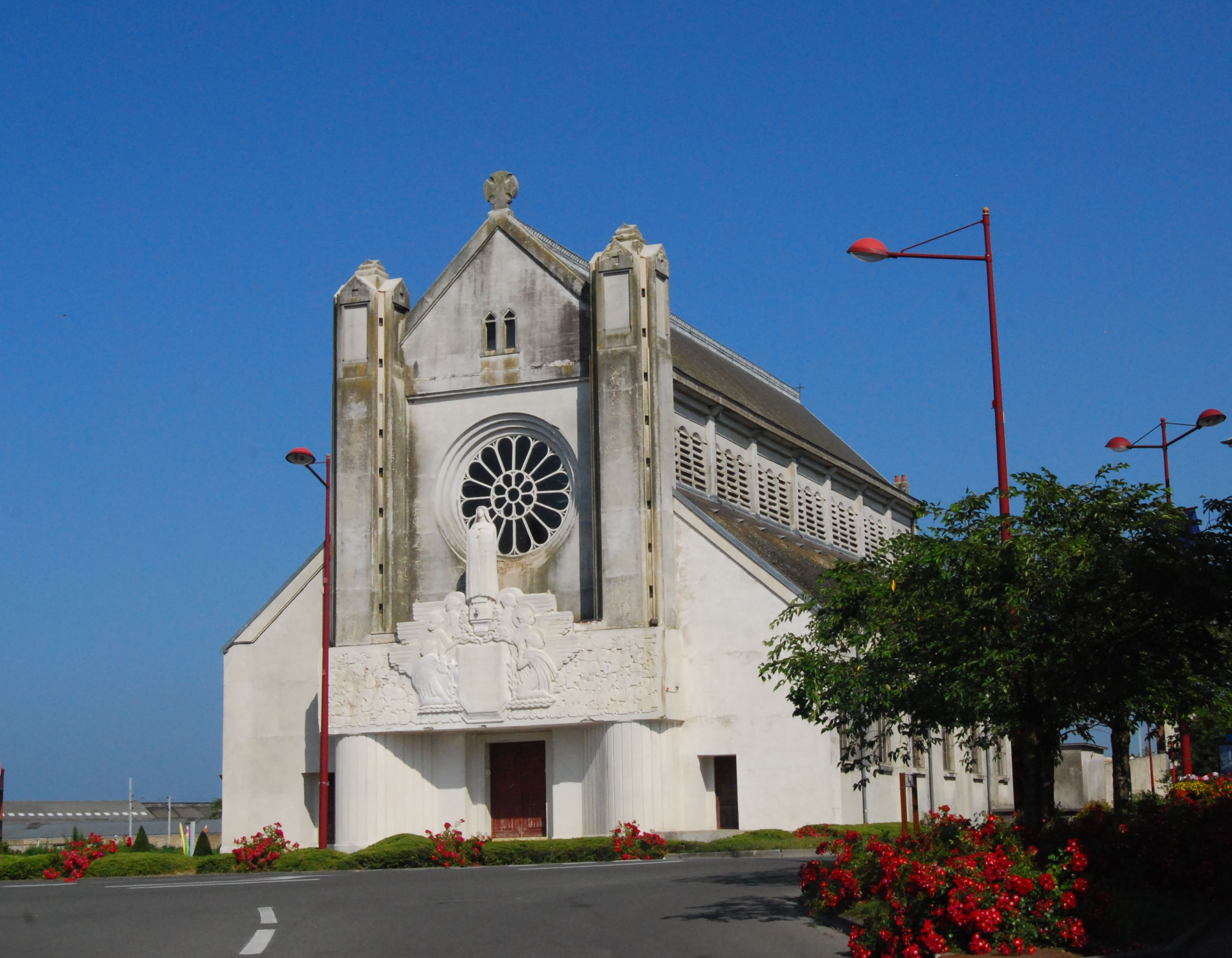
- Church of Sainte-Thérèse-de-l'Enfant-Jésus

Religion
- Affiliation: Roman Catholic
- Region: Aisne
- Ecclesiastical or organisational status: Cathedral
- Status: Active

Location
- Location: Hirson, France
- Interactive map of Church of Sainte-Thérèse-de-l'Enfant-Jésus
- Coordinates: 49.9181°N 4.0859°E

Architecture
- Type: church

The Church of Sainte-Thérèse-de-l'Enfant-Jésus ('St. Theresa of the Infant Jesus') is a former Roman Catholic church located in the city of Hirson, Aisne, France. A concert hall, it is in the Art Deco architectural tradition.

== History ==
This church, in basilica with two aisles and a bell tower is the work of the engineer Aimé Bonna, who built it at his own expense using the material that made his fortune: reinforced concrete. In the early twentieth century, the city of Hirson opened the second railway marshalling yard in France after Paris. Its population was growing and the church could not accommodate all the people. The childless Aimé Bonna, who was very attached to his roots, decided to build the Church of Sainte-Thérèse-de-l'Enfant-Jésus at his own expense. He acquired the land, financed materials and labour and supervised the construction, which began on October 3, 1929. Unfortunately, Aimé Bonna died six months before it was completed. A chapel was erected to house his remains, his funeral having been held in this church.

The campanile, which had become dilapidated and dangerous, was demolished in 2008. In September 2012, the Anglo-American pianist and composer Kit Armstrong purchased the remainder of the building, which he refurbished as a concert hall, where a festival featuring classical music and art exhibitions takes place. The opening concert took place on 3 June 2014.

== Description ==
The 23-metre church was designed by Jacques Martin. On the left side was a bell tower 45 metres high, but this was demolished on 23 November 2008. It comprised a central door and two side doors opening onto the aisles. Above, a large lintel decorated with bas-reliefs is surmounted by a statue of Saint Thérèse of Lisieux sculpted by Jacques Martin. The internal styling is Art Deco with a decorated vaulted ceiling and 1500 plaster roses, symbolizing the roses spread by St Therese.

The church was part of the Paroisse Notre Dame de Thiérache (Parish of Notre Dame of Thiérache) in the diocese of Soissons, Laon and Saint-Quentin.

== Transformation into a concert hall ==
In August 2013 the Société Musicale Sainte-Thérèse was created. This is an association to renovate and maintain the church, host musicians and artists, organize private and public concerts and promote cultural events in the Church.

== Links ==
- Hirson
- Thiérache
