= Steve McGarry =

British cartoonist (born 1953)

- Born: 24 January 1953 (age 73) Wythenshawe, Manchester, England
- Areas: Cartoonist, Writer, Artist
- Notable works: Badlands; Mullets; Biographic; KidTown
- Awards: National Cartoonist Society Newspaper Illustration Award, 2003; Australian Cartoonists' Association Illustrator of the Year, 2003; NCS Silver T-Square Award, 2012
- Spouse: Debs (m. 1984)

Steve McGarry (born 24 January 1953, in Wythenshawe, Manchester, England) is a British cartoonist whose work includes the comic strips Badlands, Pop Culture / Biographic, Trivquiz, KidTown, and Mullets.

His sports features are syndicated worldwide, and his client list has included most major soccer magazines, including Shoot, Match, Match of the Day, and kicker.

== Record sleeves and story artist ==
A former record sleeve designer, McGarry's credits include sleeve designs for Joy Division, Slaughter & The Dogs, Jilted John and John Cooper Clarke.

As a story artist, he worked on the movies Despicable Me 2, Minions, The Secret Life of Pets, and on the Electronic Arts mobile game Minions Paradise.

== Comic strips ==
McGarry's Western strip Badlands debuted in the short-lived British tabloid The Post in 1988, and then ran for 13 years in the British tabloid The Sun.

McGarry took over the weekly illustrated biography feature Biography (distributed by United Feature Syndicate) in 1989; it ran until 1991. He produced a similar strip, called Pop Culture, in the British newspaper Today from 1993 to 1996. In 2005 he launched the weekly feature Biographic, syndicated by Universal Press Syndicate/Universal Uclick/Andrews McMeel Syndication ever since.

With illustrator Rick Stromoski, McGarry created the comic strip Mullets, syndicated by Universal Press Syndicate, which ran a little over a year, from 2003 to 2005.

McGarry started KidCity in 2001 for United Feature Syndicate. Now with Andrews McMeel Syndication and known as KidTown, the weekly feature teaches kids how to read a newspaper using trivia and puzzle features.

== Exhibitions and NCSFest ==
In 2004, The Gallery at Art Institute of California, Orange County, stage a three-month retrospective exhibition of his work, “Steve McGarry: A Survey of Cartoons and Illustrations”.

In 2014, the record sleeve that McGarry designed for the 1978 Joy Division EP An Ideal for Living went on display at the Museum of Modern Art in New York.

In 2018, he designed and curated an exhibition tracing the history of soccer comics, cartoons, and illustration around the world. "Playing For A Draw" debuted at the National Football Museum in Manchester, where it ran for three months before transferring to The Brewery Arts Centre in Kendal as part of the 2018 Lakes International Comic Arts Festival. In May 2019, the exhibition was staged at the Huntington Beach Art Center in Huntington, Beach, California, as part of the inaugural NCSFest.

McGarry is the founder and Director of NCSFest. The inaugural event was staged in Huntington Beach, 17–19 May 2019 and featured more than 100 internationally acclaimed cartoonists and comics creators, family zones, a marketplace, seminars, workshops and four international art exhibitions.

== Memberships and awards ==
McGarry has been based in California since 1989. A two-term President of the National Cartoonists Society, he has been nominated six times for National Cartoonist Society Illustration awards, and received the National Cartoonist Society Newspaper Illustration Award in 2003, the same year he was named Illustrator of the Year by the Australian Cartoonists' Association. In 2012, he was awarded the Silver T-Square Award by the NCS for "outstanding service to the profession" and in 2013 became President of the NCS Foundation, the charitable arm of the National Cartoonist Society, a position he held for two four-year terms.

== Personal life ==
His twin sons, Joe and Luke McGarry, form the indie music duo Pop Noir. Under the name Fantastic Heat Brothers, they are also award-winning artists, designers and animators in their own right. Much of their output is centered around Luke McGarry's cartoon artwork.
