= Biographic (comics) =

Weekly comic strip by Steve McGarry

- Author(s): Steve McGarry
- Website: www.gocomics.com/biographic
- Current status/schedule: Current weekly strip
- Launch date: 2005; 20 years ago
- Syndicate(s): Universal Press Syndicate/Universal Uclick/Andrews McMeel Syndication (2005–present)
- Genre(s): Biography, Celebrities
- Preceded by: Biography (1986–1991); Pop Culture (1993–1996)

Biographic is a weekly comics feature by award-winning cartoonist and illustrator Steve McGarry. The teen-oriented Sunday strip provides readers with succinct illustrated biographies of contemporary celebrities such as Avril Lavigne, Tony Hawk, Orlando Bloom, and Bob Dylan. Biographic was launched in 2005 and is syndicated by Andrews McMeel Syndication. It appears in such publications as the New York Daily News, the Boston Herald, the Toronto Sun, Hong Kong's Daily Young Post, India's Mail Today, Tokyo's Sunday Mainichi, the Bangkok Post Student Weekly, and South Africa's People Magazine.

Each strip is a collage-like assembly of informative text and multiple illustrations of the subject at various stages of their career. McGarry's distinctive, stippled realistic style captures the celebrity's likeness.

McGarry has worked on similar strips since 1989. The first one was a United Feature Syndicate strip called Biography, which McGarry took over from John Roman as creator on May 14, 1989. (Biography had debuted with United Feature on June 1, 1986.) Biography lasted until 1991. Then, from 1993 to 1996, McGarry did another similar strip, called Pop Culture, which ran in the British newspaper Today. Finally, in 2005, Universal Press Syndicate launched Biographic.
