= Godmothered =

2020 film by Sharon Maguire

- Promotional poster
- Directed by: Sharon Maguire
- Screenplay by: Kari Granlund; Melissa Stack
- Story by: Kari Granlund
- Produced by: Justin Springer; Ivan Reitman
- Starring: Isla Fisher; Jillian Bell; Jane Curtin
- Cinematography: Christopher Norr
- Edited by: Gary Dollner
- Music by: Rachel Portman
- Production companies: Walt Disney Pictures; Secret Machine Entertainment; The Montecito Picture Company
- Distributed by: Disney+; Walt Disney Studios Motion Pictures
- Release date: December 4, 2020
- Running time: 110 minutes
- Country: United States
- Language: English

Godmothered is a 2020 American Christmas fantasy comedy film directed by Sharon Maguire, written by Kari Granlund and Melissa Stack, starring Jillian Bell and Isla Fisher. The Walt Disney Company first began developing the film in September 2019, with Maguire joining the production as director later that month. Principal photography began in January 2020 in Boston, Massachusetts. Produced by Walt Disney Pictures, The Montecito Picture Company and Secret Machine Entertainment, it was released on Disney+ on December 4, 2020. The film received moderately positive reviews from critics.

== Plot ==
In a magical place called the Motherland, fairy godmothers train so that they can help people's wishes come true. Among them is the youngest, and only fairy who is not elderly, Eleanor Bloomingbottom who gleefully commits to the craft despite not being very good at it. The godmothers stick to a "formula" that many have grown bored with (i.e., true love, castle, etc.). Eleanor learns from another godmother that the school is to be shut down, as nobody makes wishes anymore, and that they will have to learn to be tooth fairies instead. Determined, Eleanor checks the assignment room and discovers a letter from a 10-year-old girl named Mackenzie Walsh and decides to help her. She is aided by the oldest student, Agnes, who warns her that if she is found out, the school will shut down and, worse, her powers will be stripped.

Eleanor ends up in the real world where a friendly trucker takes her to Boston, where to her shock and dismay, Mackenzie is now a miserable 40-year-old single mother who works at a failing television station that reports on puff pieces. She manages to convince her that she is a fairy godmother by displaying her magic and Mackenzie is forced to take her home to her two daughters, Mia and Jane, and her sister Paula, who helps with looking after the kids. Mackenzie has trouble raising her children as Jane has social anxiety when it comes to singing, which she needs to do for her high school. Eleanor is forced to sleep in the basement and comes to believe, based on a comment Mackenzie made, that her husband ran away.

Eleanor begins affecting the family's lives when she starts tagging along with Mackenzie to work and meets her coworkers Duff and Hugh Prince, the latter of whom has feelings for Mackenzie, much to Eleanor's delight. Eleanor accidentally creates a colorful explosion in the sky and later creates a citywide blackout. She becomes a viral sensation following a sledding accident, the latter of which gives the news station higher ratings. Eleanor learns from Mia that Mackenzie's husband died and realizes that it is connected to Jane's anxiety and helps her by having her sing "My Favorite Things" in public. Meanwhile, Mackenzie's newfound optimism convinces her to undergo a makeover and she begins hanging out with Hugh more; himself a divorced father with a son.

Agnes tells Eleanor that she will lose her powers, should she fail to have Mackenzie's true love found by midnight the next night. She convinces Mackenzie to attend a party being thrown by their unscrupulous boss Grant and attempts to use her powers to make her fall in love with Hugh. This fails and Mackenzie berates her for trying to impede on her life. Their argument is heard by everyone at the party with Grant believing that all the recent stories were planned. Mackenzie tells Eleanor to leave, though Paula finds her fairy godmother book and sets out to look for her. To Mackenzie's surprise, Grant wants Eleanor back to exploit her. When Mackenzie refuses, Grant fires her and Hugh quits after revealing that he was offered another job.

Mackenzie learns that Jane still has anxiety, as she needs to sing for the high school at the Christmas festival that night. They find Paula trying to help Eleanor create a pumpkin carriage. They tell her that they need her and she creates a watermelon carriage to take them to the show on time. Jane performs using her father's guitar to a stunned audience. Moira, the headmistress, arrives to take Eleanor away, calling her a failure. However, Eleanor informs her that she realizes that the formula is dated and that everyone has their own idea of true love. After encouragement from the Walshes and the audience, Moira concedes that Eleanor was a success and the two of them head back with the assignment completed.

In the epilogue, rendered in traditional animation, Eleanor has become a teacher in Motherland and is seen teaching new children godmothers the new way.

== Cast ==
- Jillian Bell as Eleanor Fay Bloomingbottom / Fairy Godmother
- Isla Fisher as Mackenzie Walsh
  - Erica Parks as young Mackenzie
  - Isabelle McNamara as the voice of young Mackenzie
- Jane Curtin as Moira
- Mary Elizabeth Ellis as Paula Walsh, Mackenzie's younger sister.
- Jillian Shea Spaeder as Jane Walsh, Mackenzie's older daughter
- Willa Skye as Mia Walsh, Mackenzie's younger daughter
- Santiago Cabrera as Hugh Prince
- Artemis Pebdani as Duff
- Utkarsh Ambudkar as Grant
- Stephnie Weir as Barb
- June Squibb as Agnes
- Nelson Ascencio as Mr. Clancy
- Miguel Squires as baby showing at the very end of the movie

== Production ==
=== Development and pre-production ===
On September 7, 2019, it was reported that Walt Disney Pictures was developing a film centered around a fairy godmother in-training, tentatively titled Godmothered. The film will be an exclusive release for the company's streaming service, Disney+. Sharon Maguire joined the production as director, from a script co-written by Kari Granlund and Melissa Stack, produced by Justin Springer and Ivan Reitman's Montecito Pictures. On January 30, 2020, Tom Pollock, Amie Karp and Diane L. Sabatini were revealed to be serving as executive producers for the film alongside Reitman.

=== Casting ===
On January 9, 2020, Jillian Bell and Isla Fisher joined the cast in the lead roles. On January 30, 2020, Jane Curtin, Jillian Shea Spaeder, Willa Skye, Mary Elizabeth Ellis, Santiago Cabrera, Artemis Pebdani, Utkarsh Ambudkar, Stephnie Weir, June Squibb, and Carlease Burke joined the film's cast.

=== Filming ===
Production for Godmothered began on January 20, 2020, on Washington Street and Pleasant Street in Boston, as well as in Marblehead, Massachusetts, under the working title Frills. Disney officially announced the start of production on the film on January 30, 2020. Filming was also expected to take place at North Square on February 6, 2020, but was rescheduled to February 28 due to weather conditions. Filming also occurred in Brasenose College, Oxford on March 7, 2020. Filming for Godmothered wrapped by April 2020. Weir and Ambudkar improvised heavily during filming, with many of their scenes ending up in the final cut.

=== Post-production ===
Post-production for Godmothered began by April 2020. The film features an epilogue rendered in hand-drawn animation by Studio AKA. According to Maguire, the idea of using hand-drawn animation was considered before filming, and later discarded. However, the filmmakers ultimately decided to use animation for the epilogue in response to the COVID-19 pandemic shutdown, which left the filmmakers unable to film any additional footage. 40 Studio AKA animators worked remotely on the sequence under the supervision of supervising animator Aya Suzuki. While the characters were hand-drawn animated, the sets were created through CG. The animators sought for the epilogue to "feel very much in the tradition of Disney animation" while also feeling unique. Animators were inspired by early Disney films for the staging, colour, and lighting, while also adding texture to give the animation a storybook film, as the sequence opened with a book. Several designs were made for Eleanor, who had to fit the epilogue's cartoonish look while also resembling Jilian Bell. The animators started by working on rough animation in order to get performance approval, before being set to clean up for coloring and texture.

== Soundtrack ==
Rachel Portman composed and produced the score for the film. Jillian Shea Spaeder performed two songs for the film's end credits, titled "Rise Up (Joy to the World)" and "Hero". The soundtrack was released on December 4, 2020, alongside the film.

== Release ==
Godmothered was released on December 4, 2020, on Disney+.

== Reception ==
=== Critical response ===
On review aggregator Rotten Tomatoes, the film holds an approval rating of 68% based on 72 critic reviews, with an average rating of 5.6/10. The website's critics consensus reads, "More bippity boppity than boo, Godmothered tweaks fairytale conventions with just enough self-aware humor to overcome a disappointing deficit of genuine magic." On Metacritic, it has a weighted average score of 49 out of 100 based on 12 critics, indicating "mixed or average" reviews.

Alonso Duralde of TheWrap praised the humor of the movie and the emotional weight across its ending, complimented the visual effects, and applauded the chemistry between Jillian Bell and Isla Fisher, writing "Younger viewers are more likely to find “Godmothered” enchanting, but there's enough good cheer (and smart messaging) for willing adults as well." Nick Allen of RogerEbert.com gave the movie 3 out of 4 stars, praised the movie's humor, calling it a "charming family comedy", and complimented the performances of the actors, writing, "the cuteness of Godmothered is a winning one overall, especially in how it uses a playful sense of humor and good heart to find its own way to Happily Ever After." Jennifer Green of Common Sense Media rated the film 3 out of 5 stars and praised the film for its depiction of positive messages and role models, saying, "Godmothered is a contemporary twist on the traditional Cinderella tale. [...] What will stick is Eleanor's sweetness and humor and her total belief in fairy-tale concepts like princes, princesses, castles, carriages, magic, love, and happy endings. All of which get thrown into question in a lighthearted way that's meant to show kids that true love can come in many different forms and that happy endings aren't only about a man and a woman getting married."

Robyn Bahr of The Hollywood Reporter complimented the performances of the cast and found it to be an effective Christmas-themed film with a solid concept, but said Godmothered never really manages to surprise its audience, writing, "Godmothered is pleasant enough, a cheeky and nostalgic Christmas-themed family comedy [...] But Godmothered would have distinguished itself with more narrational novelty." Natalia Winkelman of The New York Times stated, "The film's idea is to re-examine and revise the fairy tale formula, and in some ways, it succeeds. [...] But for an updated princess story, Godmothered, directed by Sharon Maguire, is fairly conventional." Kate Erbland of IndieWire gave the film a C− rating, stating, "Sharon Maguire's family comedy has a good heart and a clever central idea, but there's no shine left on this Disney+ bauble."

== Accolades ==
Year	Award	Category	Nominee(s)	Result	Ref.
2021	Makeup Artist and Hair Stylist Guild Awards	Best Period Hair Styling and/or Character Hair Styling - Television Special, One Hour or More Live Program Series, or Movie for Television	Melissa Yonkey, Susan Buffington, Marie Larkin	Nominated	
2021	IFMCA Awards	Best Original Score for a Comedy Film	Rachel Portman	Nominated	

== See also ==
- List of Christmas films
