= Matthew Shaffer =

American actor (born 1978)

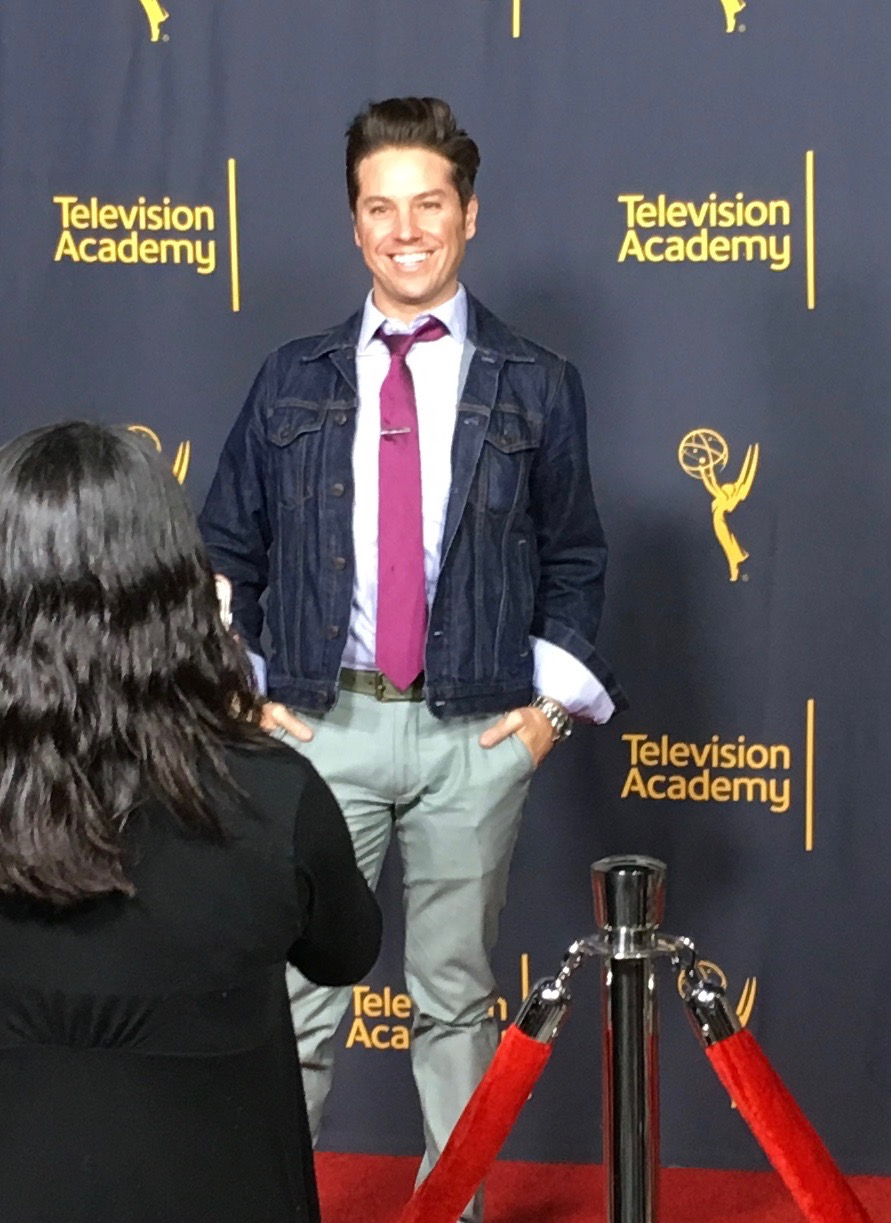
- Matthew Shaffer in attendance at the Television Academy's event, "Whose Dance Is It Anyway?" celebrating the work of choreographers.
- Born: Matthew Joseph Shaffer; May 4, 1978 (age 48); Colorado
- Occupations: Actor, dancer, choreographer, author
- Years active: 1992–present
- Notable work: So You Want To Be A Dancer?, Dancing Out of the Closet
- Spouse: Jeffrey Paynton (m. 2013; div. 2021)

Matthew Joseph Shaffer (born May 4, 1978) is an American musical theatre, television, and film actor, director, executive producer, author, and choreographer. He was born in Florence, Colorado, USA.

== Career ==
Shaffer began his career in Southern California. He attended the Orange County High School of the Arts. He was accepted as a performing apprentice to the concert dance company Giordano Dance Chicago in 1996. He became a principal in the company the following year. After three years touring the United States and Europe he left the company. He worked in the ensemble of the Radio City Christmas Spectacular at Radio City Music Hall in New York City for five seasons. Shaffer was involved in the final stunt of the feature film Jackass Number Two, with Johnny Knoxville. Shaffer had comedic roles in two off-beat and independent short films: Feet Afire in 2005, and in 2006, the movie Queerspiracy, which was an official selection at the 2007 Breckenridge Film Festival. In November 2006, he originated the role of Bergdwarf Goodman, the narrative gnome in the Los Angeles Opera production of Hansel and Gretel at the Dorothy Chandler Pavilion. In October 2007, he completed his first 35 mm film project as choreographer on the set of Harrison Bergeron, based on the Kurt Vonnegut short story. In November 2007, Shaffer originated the lead role of "Sim" in the revival of Ray Bradbury's Frost and Fire directed by Zina Bethune, at the Alex Theatre, in Los Angeles, CA. From 2010 through 2015, Shaffer and his producing partner, Jeff Payton, created 40 pop culture digital shorts, which garnered a large fan base and led them to create and option two television pilots. In 2015, Shaffer's first book, "So You Want To Be A Dancer", was published by Rowman & Littlefield Publishing Group. In 2016, he was commissioned by Slippery Rock University of Pennsylvania to choreograph his first concert dance piece entitled, "Give Me A Mingus" set to the music of Charles Mingus. In 2023, Matthew earned his Master of Fine Arts degree in directing and choreography, from Wilson College.

== Roles ==
=== Theatre ===
- Nostalgia Radio Hour Presents: Growing Pangs...Writer and Director...City Garage Theatre,Santa Monica (2023)
- Hansel and Gretel...reprised his role of “Gnome”...Dorothy Chandler Pavilion, Los Angeles, CA (2018)
- Maggie Miguel ...a corporate American employee...Director and Choreographer...One Woman Show starring Maggie Miguel ...ACME Comedy Theatre, Los Angeles, CA (March 2009)
- Share Inc. Boomtown Benefit...Ensemble...Santa Monica Civic Auditorium, Santa Monica, California (2008)
- Frost and Fire...originated lead role “Sim”...Alex Theatre,Los Angeles, CA (2007)
- Hansel and Gretel...originated the role “Gnome”...Dorothy Chandler Pavilion, Los Angeles, CA (2006)
- Stand Up Salad...Comic...Friars Club of Beverly Hills (2006)
- Radio City Christmas Spectacular...Ensemble...Radio City Music Hall...(2000–2005, Five Seasons)
- Tess’ Last Night...The Stalker...Greenwich House Theatre, New York City (2003)
- 16th Annual BC/EFA Easter Bonnet Competition...Ensemble...New Amsterdam Theatre (2002)
- On A Clear Day You Can See Forever (Workshop)...Ensemble...New York City Center (2001)
- Synthesis Dance Project...Ensemble...NYC (2000)
- TheMantis Project...Trio of Three performer...Symphony Space, NYC (2000)
- Pat and Debby Boone Show... Ensemble...Branson, MO (1999)
- Andy Williams Show...Ensemble...Branson, MO (1998)
- Giordano Dance Chicago...Principal Dancer...Chicago, IL (1997–1999, Three Seasons)
- Chicago Symphony Orchestra...Ensemble Dancer...Chicago, IL (1997)
- Hercules Spectacular...Ensemble...Chicago Theatre (1997)

=== Film/Television ===
- The Affair (Showtime)...Choreographer (2017)
- Crazy Ex-Girlfriend (The CW)...Actor (2016)
- Broad City (Comedy Central)...Actor (2016)
- Wet Hot American Summer: First Day of Camp (Netflix)...Actor (2015)
- Kickin' It (Disney XD)...Actor (2011)
- Billy Glimmer (Ben Stiller Project)...Choreographer (2010)
- The Real Housewives Parody Movie Executive producer / Writer / Director / Actor (2010)
- Children's Hospital Choreographer (2010)
- Harrison Bergeron 35 mm film...Choreographer (2007)
- Twinkle Time (Television pilot)...Choreographer / Actor (2007)
- Michael Poppins (Television pilot)...Tambourine Man (2007)
- Queerspiracy...Justin Davies (2006)
- Cold Case...Kit Kat Boy (2006)
- Jackass Number Two...Dancer (2006)
- Earth To America...Performer (2005)
- Feet Afire...Chad La Rosa (2005)
- Mona Lisa Smile...Dancer (2002)
- All My Children...Featured (2001)

== Writings ==
Shaffer authored his first book, So You Want To Be A Dancer, on March 9, 2015. On March 29, 2015, he launched So You Want To Be A Dancer at the Broadway Dance Center and continued on a nationwide tour, teaching and promoting his book, which was a Number 1 New Release in the Performing Arts category on Amazon.com. Matthew is also one of fifty contributing authors of the book, The I'Mpossible Project: Reengaging With Life, Creating a New You, an inspirational book which highlights topics including, empowerment, suicide prevention, and LGBT themes, released by Skookum Hill Publishing on January 13, 2016. On September 10, 2019, Shaffer released his sophomore book Dancing Out of the Closet, a collection of comedically true stories about his life as a performer living "in" and eventually "out" of the closet.

== Published works ==
- Shaffer, Matthew (2015). So You Want To Be A Dancer. Maryland: Rowman & Littlefield. ISBN 9781630760267.
- Shaffer, Matthew (2016). The i'Mpossible Project: Reengaging With Life, Creating a New You. New York: Skookum Hill. ISBN 9780986096471.
- Shaffer, Matthew (2019). Dancing Out of the Closet. Georgia: BearManor Media. ISBN 9781629334554.
- Shaffer, Matthew (2023). Nostalgia Radio Hour Presents: Growing Pangs. USA: Amazon. ISBN 979-8392615902.
