= Alfred Desmasures =

Alfred Desmasures was a French journalist writer essayist and historian, born in Mondrepuis January 20, 1832 and died the May 20, 1893 in Hirson.

Known for his republican ideas, he was sentenced to four months in prison in 1855 for "peddling of political literature". From September 9 to 15, 1870, he was posted acting Prefect of Aisne. First haberdasher, he became a bookseller and printer in the fall of 1879 at Hirson, but also a journalist, writer, essayist and historian. Author of numerous books on the history of Thiérache, he founded several newspapers (Le Nord de la Thiérache, l'Hirsonnais, la Thiérache Républicaine).

The museum and documentation center of the city of Hirson bears his name.

== Writings ==
- Histoire des communes du canton de Trélon : et notes historiques sur ses environs, Imprimerie de Dubois-Viroux, 1860
- Histoire des communes du canton d'Hirson suivie de la biographie des hommes célèbres nés dans ce canton, et de notes historiques, Imprimerie de Papillon, 1863
- Histoire de la Révolution dans le département de l'Aisne 1789, Imprimerie de Flem, 1869
- Propagande républicaine. Cahier d'un paysan. Étude sur la constitution politique de la France, Décembre-Alonnier, 1872
- De l'organisation de la démocratie : propagande patriotique, Imprimerie de Bugnicourt, 1873
- La République française en 1879, Imprimerie de Mauclère-Dufour, 1878
- Histoire de Saint-Michel en Thiérache, Imprimerie-librairie du Nord de la Thiérache, 1883
- Histoire des villages de Buire, d'Éparcy et de La Hérie, Imprimerie du Nord de la Thiérache, 1892
- Histoire du village de Bucilly et de son abbaye, Imprimerie du Nord de la Thiérache, 1892
- Histoire de la ville d'Hirson, Imprimerie du Nord de la Thiérache, 1892
- Ephémérides du nord de la France (antérieur à 1874)
