= Jillian Bell =

American actress and comedian (born 1984)

- Born: Jillian Leigh Bell; April 25, 1984 (age 42); Henderson, Nevada, U.S.
- Education: Bishop Gorman High School
- Occupations: Actress; comedian; screenwriter
- Years active: 2006–present
- Partner: Luke McGarry

Jillian Leigh Bell (born April 25, 1984) is an American actress, comedian, and screenwriter. She was a writer for the 35th season of the NBC sketch comedy series Saturday Night Live between 2009 and 2010.

Since her departure from SNL, she has had starring roles in the films Brittany Runs a Marathon (2019) and I'm Totally Fine (2022). Her other film credits include 22 Jump Street (2014), Fist Fight (2017), Godmothered (2020), and Candy Cane Lane (2023). Bell is engaged to illustrator and musician Luke McGarry.

She has also acted in television, starring as Jillian Belk on Workaholics, voicing Violet Hart on Bless the Harts, and in a recurring role as Dixie on the final season of Eastbound & Down.

== Early life ==
Bell was born and raised in Henderson, Nevada. She began studying improv at age eight. She graduated from Bishop Gorman High School in Las Vegas in 2002, moved to Los Angeles, and became a member of the comedy group The Groundlings.

== Career ==
Bell auditioned for Saturday Night Live, and although she did not join the cast, she became a writer for the show in 2009 for its 35th season. That year she also appeared in an episode of Curb Your Enthusiasm as an assistant wearing revealing clothing at work.

In 2011, Bell began playing Jillian Belk on the Comedy Central series Workaholics. Film director Paul Thomas Anderson saw her in it and gave her a small role in his 2012 film The Master, then another small role in his 2014 film Inherent Vice. She had a recurring role as Dixie in the fourth and final season of Eastbound & Down. In 2014, she appeared in 22 Jump Street with Jonah Hill and Channing Tatum. In 2015, she co-starred in Goosebumps and The Night Before.

In January 2016, Bell portrayed the constantly misbehaving adult daughter of wealthy parents in a Comedy Central series, Idiotsitter; it had originally launched as a web series in early 2014. She starred as the Fairy Godmother in Disney's Godmothered, a film released on Disney+ in 2020 and also starring Isla Fisher.

== Filmography ==
Key
†	Denotes works that have not yet been released

=== Film ===
Year	Title	Role	Notes
2011	Bridesmaids	Girl at Shower	
2012	Love, Gloria	Cheryl	
2012	The Master	Susan Gregory	
2014	22 Jump Street	Mercedes Nillsen	
2014	Inherent Vice	Chlorinda	
2015	Goosebumps	Lorraine Conyers	
2015	The Night Before	Betsy Greenberg	
2016	The Angry Birds Movie	Helene the Lunch Mom, Yoga Instructor	Voice
2016	Office Christmas Party	Trina Vanstone	
2017	Fist Fight	Counselor Holly	
2017	Rough Night	Alice	
2018	Game Over, Man!	Embarrassed Girl	
2019	Brittany Runs a Marathon	Brittany Forgler	Also executive producer
2019	Sword of Trust	Cynthia	
2020	Cowboys	Sally	
2020	Bill & Ted Face the Music	Dr. Taylor Wood	
2020	Godmothered	Eleanor Fay Bloomingbottom / Fairy Godmother	
2022	The Drop	Lindsey	
2022	I'm Totally Fine	Vanessa	
2023	Murder Mystery 2	Susan	
2023	Fool's Paradise	Shaman	
2023	Good Burger 2	Katt Bozwell	
2023	Candy Cane Lane	Pepper	
2024	Reunion	Vivian	Also executive producer
2025	Kinda Pregnant	Kate	
2025	Summer of 69	Cashier	Also director

=== Television ===
Year	Title	Role	Notes
2006	Crossbows & Mustaches	Denise	Television shorts
2007–2008	Preppy Hippies	Jillian	5 episodes
2009	Waiting to Die	Kristy	Pilot
2009	Worst Week	Eleanor	Episode: "The Puppy"
2009–2010	Saturday Night Live	Team Helga Curling Player	Episode: "Jennifer Lopez"; also writer
2009–2024	Curb Your Enthusiasm	Maureen	2 episodes
2011	Franklin & Bash	Jennifer Putnam	Episode: "Jennifer of Troy"
2011	Friends with Benefits	Amanda	Episode: "The Benefit of Keeping Your Ego in Check"
2011–2017	Workaholics	Jillian Belk	44 episodes
2012–2013	Partners	Renata	6 episodes
2013	To My Future Assistant		Pilot
2013	Eastbound & Down	Dixie	8 episodes
2013	High School USA!	Miriam	Voice, episode: "Rumsprinabreakers"
2014	Gravity Falls	Melody	Voice, 2 episodes
2015	Lucas Bros Moving Co	Beyonce, Laura	Voice, 2 episodes
2015–2019	SuperMansion	Lex Lightning	Voice, 20 episodes
2016	Portlandia	Car Rental Clerk	Episode: "Weirdo Beach"
2016	Son of Zorn	Dorothy Clementina, Headbutt Girl	Voice, episode: "Return of the Drinking Buddy"
2016–2017	Idiotsitter	Genevieve "Gene" Russell	Also creator and writer
2017	Dogs In a Park	Various Dogs	8 episodes
2018	Drunk History	Clara Kinsey	Episode: "Sex"
2018–present	Bob's Burgers	Mandy, Nat	Voice, 7 episodes
2019	Ryan Hansen Solves Crimes on Television	Herself	Episode: "The Rhy Chromosome"
2019	Neurotica	Hailey	Episode: "Eureka!"
2019	What Just Happened??! with Fred Savage	Herself	Episode: "Elevator"
2019	Human Discoveries	Minerva	Voice, recurring role
2019	Archer	Captain Glenda Price	Voice, episode: "Dining with the Zarglorp"
2019	Nailed It!	Guest host	Episode: "One Fail, Two Fail. I Fail, You Fail!"
2019–2021	Bless the Harts	Violet Hart	Voice, recurring role
2019–2022	Green Eggs and Ham	Gluntz	Voice, recurring role
2020	Impractical Jokers: Dinner Party	Herself	Episode: "The Eggplant Parm Episode"
2020	Room 104	Sam	Episode: "Star Time"
2021	Home Sweet Homegoods	Jillian	6 episodes
2022	Tales of the Walking Dead	Gina	Episode: "Blair / Gina"
2022	Roar	Christina	Episode: "The Woman Who Solved Her Own Murder"
2022	Impractical Jokers	Herself	Episode: "Jillian Bell"
2023	History of the World, Part II	Head Writer	Episode: "VIII"
2024	Tales of the Teenage Mutant Ninja Turtles	Lee the Eel	Voice, guest role
2025	Sausage Party: Foodtopia	Trish the Walnut	Voice, main role

== Accolades ==
In 2010, Bell was nominated for a Primetime Emmy Award for Outstanding Writing for a Variety Series for her work in the writers' room on Saturday Night Live. In 2015, she was nominated for two MTV Movie Awards for her work on 22 Jump Street: Best Villain and, with co-star Jonah Hill, Best Fight.

In 2019, she received the Fairbanks Award at the San Diego International Film Festival and the Next Wave Award at the Provincetown International Film Festival on Cape Cod, Massachusetts.
