= Walter Perez (reporter) =

American journalist (born 1970)

- Born: Walter Perez; October 31, 1970 (age 55); Edison, New Jersey
- Other name: Walter Percy
- Education: Duke University
- Occupations: Anchor, journalist, reporter
- Years active: 2003-present
- Website: http://6abc.com/about/newsteam/walter-perez/

Walter Perez is an Argentinian-American weekend evening anchor, journalist and a weekday reporter for WPVI, the ABC network affiliate in Philadelphia, Pennsylvania. He joined WPVI in September 2003 and continues to report for Action News, primarily assigned to the Lehigh Valley region.

Raised in Edison, New Jersey, as "Walter Percy", he played football at Edison High School.

Perez graduated from Duke University with a bachelor's degree in political science. He began broadcasting on the radio at WCTC News-Talk Radio 1450AM, which was the highest-rated radio talk show in Central New Jersey. He also broadcast for Princeton Football Radio Network as a color commentator for five years.

Perez later began reporting on television as an anchor and reporter for WPLG in Miami as well as News 12 New Jersey. He later worked as reporter and weekend morning anchor for WNBC in New York City before joining WPVI in 2003.

Perez's honors have included a New York City Press Club award, two New Jersey Associated Press awards, an Edward R. Murrow award for spot coverage and a New York State Broadcasters award.

He is a resident of the Monmouth Junction section of South Brunswick, New Jersey.
