= Edison Township Public Schools =

School district in Middlesex County, New Jersey, United States

Address
- 312 Pierson Avenue Edison, Middlesex County, New Jersey, 08837; United States
- Coordinates: 40.533231°N 74.348738°W

District information
- Grades: PreK-12
- Superintendent: Edward Aldarelli
- Business administrator: Jonathan Toth
- School board: Biral Patel (president); Joseph Romano (vice-president); Shannon Peng; Virginia White; Anjana Patel; Douglas Schneider; Christopher Lugo; Brian Rivera; Vishal Patel
- Schools: 19

Students and staff
- Enrollment: 16,268 (as of 2021–22)
- Faculty: 1,215.0 FTEs
- Student–teacher ratio: 13.4:1

Other information
- District Factor Group: GH
- Website: www.edison.k12.nj.us
Ind.	Per pupil	District spending	Rank (*)	K-12 average	%± vs. average
1A	Total Spending	$16,443	22	$18,891	−13.0%
1	Budgetary Cost	12,590	15	14,783	−14.8%
2	Classroom Instruction	8,403	39	8,763	−4.1%
6	Support Services	1,747	18	2,392	−27.0%
8	Administrative Cost	1,006	2	1,485	−32.3%
10	Operations & Maintenance	1,270	14	1,783	−28.8%
13	Extracurricular Activities	144	13	268	−46.3%
16	Median Teacher Salary	87,052	103	64,043
Data from NJDoE 2014 Taxpayers' Guide to Education Spending. *Of K-12 districts with over 3,500 students. Lowest spending=1; Highest=103

The Edison Township Public Schools is a comprehensive community public school district, serving students in pre-kindergarten through twelfth grade from Edison, in Middlesex County, in the U.S. state of New Jersey. The school district has two preschools, 11 elementary schools, four middle schools and two high schools that are part of the district, serving a culturally diverse student population.

As of the 2021–22 school year, the district, containing 19 schools, had an enrollment of 16,268 students and 1,215.0 classroom teachers (on an FTE basis), for a student–teacher ratio of 13.4:1.

The district had an annual budget of $367 million in 2024, with school taxes kept level since 2021.

The district had been classified by the New Jersey Department of Education as being in District Factor Group "GH", the third-highest of eight groupings. District Factor Groups organize districts statewide to allow comparison by common socioeconomic characteristics of the local districts. From lowest socioeconomic status to highest, the categories are A, B, CD, DE, FG, GH, I and J.

== Schools ==
The two public high schools separate the north and south ends of Edison. In the Edison High School zone to the south, there are six K-5 elementary schools and two 6-8 middle schools, while in the J.P. Stevens High School zone to the north there are five K-5 elementary schools and two 6-8 middle schools. Schools in the district (with 2021-22 enrollment data from the National Center for Education Statistics) are the following:

Preschools

- Edison Early Learning Center (53 students; grades PreK-K)
- Franklin D. Roosevelt Preschool (124; PreK-K)

Elementary schools

- Benjamin Franklin Elementary School (602; K-5)
- Martin Luther King Jr. Elementary School (618; K-5)
- Lincoln Elementary School (900; K-5)
- Lindeneau Elementary School (444; K-5)
- James Madison Primary School (455; K-2, who then move on to James Madison Intermediate)
- James Madison Intermediate School (521; 3–5)
- John Marshall Elementary School (736; K-5)
- Menlo Park Elementary School (796; K-5)
- James Monroe Elementary School (521; K-5)
- Washington Elementary School (589; K-5)
- Woodbrook Elementary School (902; K-5)

Middle schools

- John Adams Middle School (980; 6–8, from James Madison Intermediate and MLK Jr.)
- Herbert Hoover Middle School (911; 6–8, from Franklin, Lincoln, Monroe, and some Lindeneau)
- Thomas Jefferson Middle School (868; 6–8, from Lindeneau, Marshall, Washington, and some Woodbrook and Lincoln)
- Woodrow Wilson Middle School (1,163; from Menlo Park, Woodbrook, and some James Madison Intermediate)

High schools

- Edison High School (2,243; 9–12, from Hoover, Jefferson, and some Wilson)
- J.P. Stevens High School (2,643; 9–12, from Adams and Wilson)

James Monroe Elementary School was destroyed in a six-alarm fire on March 22, 2014. With nearly $24 million in insurance proceeds, the school was rebuilt and reopened to students in January 2017.

The school district has a technology program, which involves kindergarteners and first graders with iPads, students in second through eighth with Chromebooks, and ninth through 12th with MacBooks.

=== Connect-ED ===
For the 2007–08 school year, students were asked to provide home telephone numbers for the new ConnectED system. This automated notification system allows automated telephone calls to be placed to parents and staff in the event of an emergency. The system is also connected to the district-wide attendance system. Should a student be absent from school, a call is automatically placed to the telephone number provided.

== Awards and recognition ==
In 2009–10, Martin Luther King Jr. Elementary School received the National Blue Ribbon Award of Excellence from the United States Department of Education, the highest honor that an American school can achieve.

J.P. Stevens was the 30th-ranked public high school in New Jersey out of 339 schools statewide, in New Jersey Monthly magazine's September 2014 cover story on the state's "Top Public High Schools", after being ranked 80th in 2012 out of 328 schools. Edison High School was ranked 135th in 2014 and 174th in 2012.

== Administration ==
Core members of the district's administration are:

- Edward Aldarelli, Superintendent
- Jonathan Toth, business administrator / board secretary

== Board of education ==
The district's board of education, which consists of nine members, sets policy and oversees the fiscal and educational operation of the district through its administration. As a Type II school district, the board's trustees are elected directly by voters to serve three-year terms of office on a staggered basis, with three seats up for election each year held (since 2015) as part of the November general election. The board appoints a superintendent to oversee the district's day-to-day operations and a business administrator to supervise the business functions of the district.

== Overcrowding ==
In recent years, overcrowding in public schools has become a noticeable issue. Additions to school buildings have already been built at Woodbrook and Menlo Park Elementary Schools, and portable classrooms have been installed at Franklin D. Roosevelt Preschool and Woodrow Wilson Middle School. Voters rejected a $189.5 million proposal to expand six schools in December 2019, as well as a modified $183.2 million proposal in March 2020.
