= Kit Armstrong =

American pianist and composer

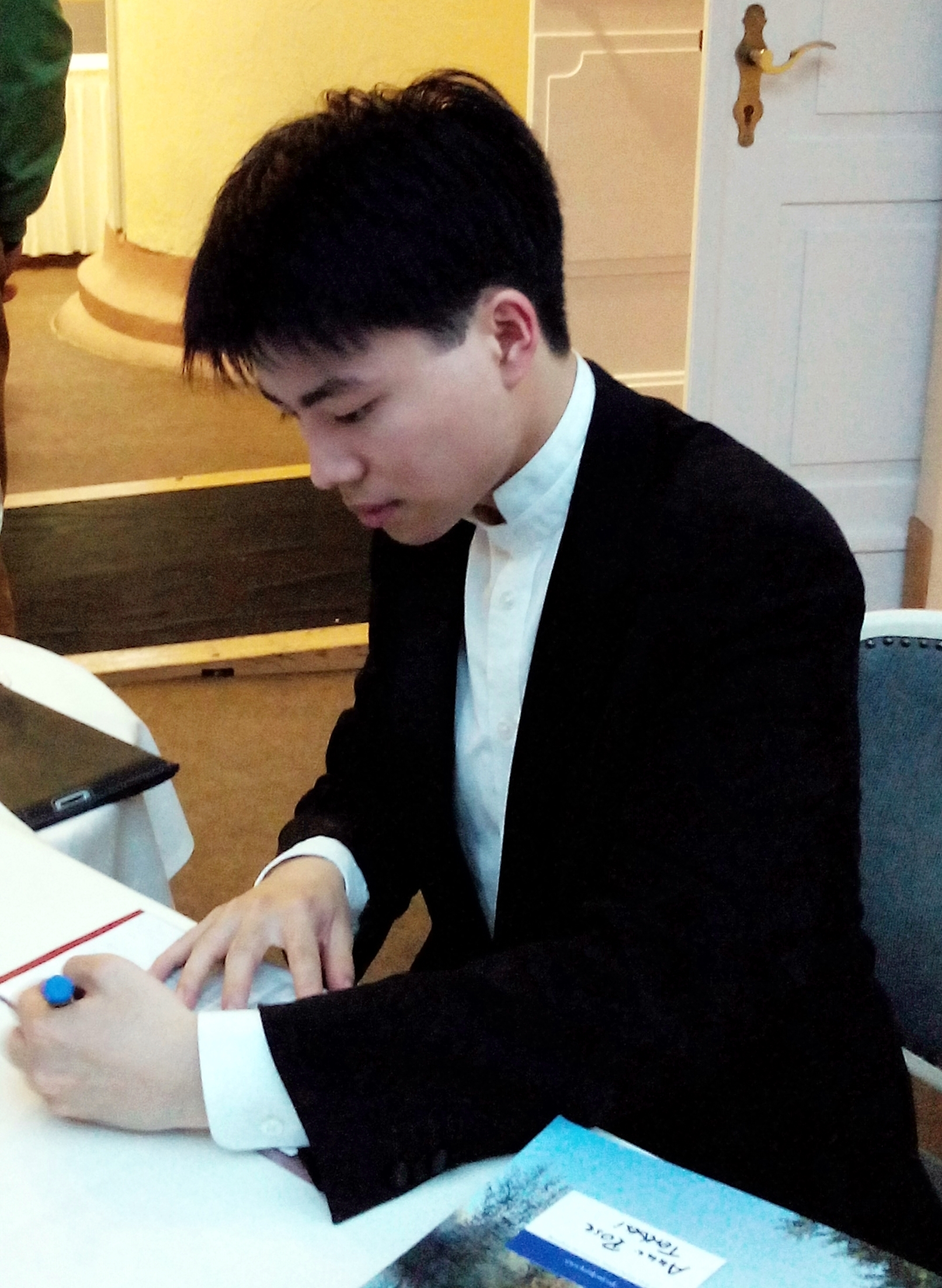
Kit Armstrong in 2014

Kit Armstrong (Chinese: 周善祥; pinyin: Zhōu Shànxiáng, born March 5, 1992) is an American classical pianist, composer, organist, and former child prodigy of British-Taiwanese parentage.

== Education ==
Armstrong was born in Los Angeles into a non-musical family. He displayed interest in sciences, languages and mathematics. At the age of 5, and without access to a piano, he taught himself musical composition by reading an abridged encyclopedia. He subsequently began formal studies in piano with Mark Sullivan and in composition with Michael Martin (1997–2001).

He attended Garden Grove Christian School (1997–1998), Anaheim Discovery Christian School (1998–1999), Los Alamitos High School and Orange County School of the Arts (1999–2001). While in high school, he studied physics at California State University, Long Beach, and music composition at Chapman University.

At the age of 9, he became a full-time undergraduate student at Utah State University studying biology, physics, mathematics as well as music (2001–2002). In 2003, Armstrong enrolled at the Curtis Institute of Music studying piano with Eleanor Sokoloff and Claude Frank, while simultaneously taking courses in chemistry and mathematics at the University of Pennsylvania. In 2004, Armstrong moved to London to continue his music education at the Royal Academy of Music studying piano with Benjamin Kaplan, composition with Paul Patterson, Christopher Brown and Gary Carpenter, and musicianship classes with Julian Perkins. In parallel, he studied pure mathematics at the Imperial College London (2004–2008).

Armstrong studied regularly with Alfred Brendel starting in 2005.

In 2021, Armstrong began his Ph.D. studies in Electrical Engineering at National Tsing Hua University, focusing on using the Kuramoto model to study AI and human collaboration in piano music performance.

== Career as pianist ==
Since Armstrong's debut with the Long Beach Bach Festival Orchestra at the age of 8, he has appeared as soloist with the Leipzig Gewandhaus Orchestra, London's Philharmonia Orchestra, the NDR Symphony Orchestra in Hamburg, the Bamberger Symphoniker, the Orchestre de la Suisse Romande, the Mozarteum Orchestra of Salzburg, the Swedish Chamber Orchestra, the Gothenburg Symphony Orchestra, the Baltimore Symphony Orchestra, and Tokyo Symphony Orchestra, among others. He has collaborated with conductors including Ivor Bolton, Riccardo Chailly, Thomas Dausgaard, Christoph von Dohnányi, Manfred Honeck, Charles Mackerras, Bobby McFerrin, Kent Nagano, Jonathan Nott, and Mario Venzago. Solo piano recitals have taken Armstrong to London, Paris, Vienna, Florence, Venice, Baden-Baden, Berlin, Dortmund, Leipzig, Munich, Zurich, Geneva, Bolzano, Verbier, La Roque-d'Anthéron and various cities in the United States.

In June 2003, Armstrong was invited to play at the Carnegie Hall to celebrate the 150th anniversary of Steinway & Sons. In 2006 he won the "Kissinger Klavierolymp", a competition of young pianists related to the festival Kissinger Sommer. Among his recital projects in 2010 was a programme including etudes by Chopin and Ligeti, and J. S. Bach's Inventions and Sinfoniae. In 2011, in honour of the 200th anniversary of the birth of Franz Liszt, Armstrong played a series of recitals featuring works by Bach and Liszt, including a concert on Liszt's 1862 Bechstein piano in Nike Wagner's festival Pelerinages. In 2016 and 2017 Armstrong appeared at the Salzburg Mozartwoche with Renaud Capuçon. Armstrong was the "artiste étoile" of the 2016 Mozart Festival Würzburg and of the Bern Symphony Orchestra.

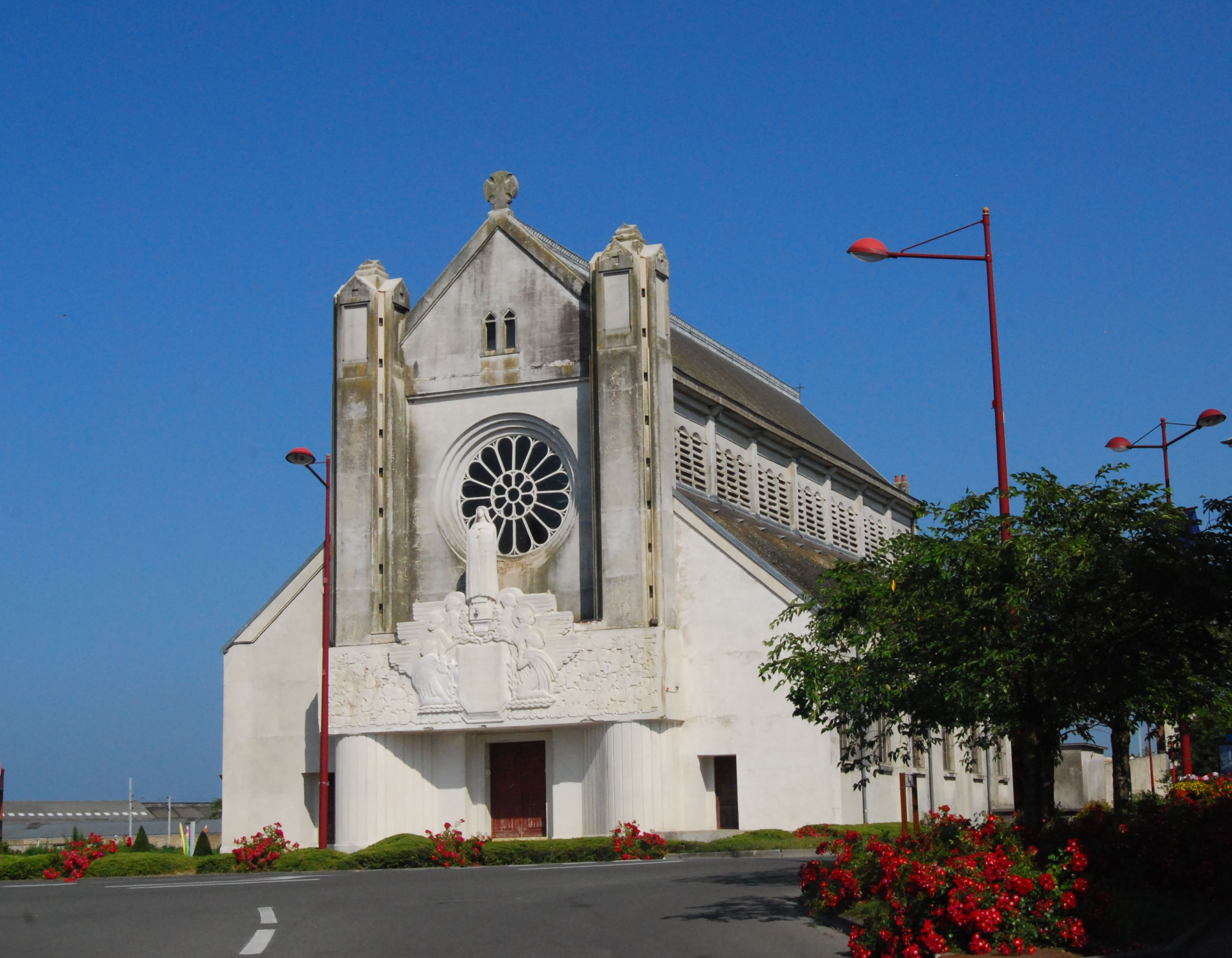
Armstrong's concert hall, the Church of Sainte-Thérèse-de-l'Enfant-Jésus, Hirson, France

The Schleswig-Holstein Musik Festival awarded Armstrong the 2010 Leonard Bernstein Award. In 2011 he received the Förderpreis für Musik from the Kurt-Alten-Stiftung. The Mecklenburg-Vorpommern Festival announced Kit Armstrong as WEMAG-Soloist prizewinner in 2014. Kit Armstrong was the festival's 2018 "prizewinner in residence", featuring in 24 concerts throughout the summer of 2018. Kit Armstrong was named holder of the Beethoven Ring in 2018.

In 2012, he purchased The Church of Sainte-Thérèse-de-l'Enfant-Jésus, Hirson in France as a hall for concerts and exhibitions.

Starting in March 2020, he has published every day a video from this church, sharing a piece of music together with personal and musicological explanations. This video series, "Musique, ma patrie", is the subject of profiles in French national television and press.

== Career as composer ==
Armstrong’s compositional catalogue includes works for a wide range of ensembles, with early works written during his teenage years and later works reflecting increasing formal scope. Many of his works reflect a grounding in the Western classical tradition, and his music has been described as stylistically varied within that frame. His works often demonstrate contrapuntal textures, formal balance, and a close engagement with historical models, particularly from the Baroque and Classical eras. Observers have drawn attention to the influence of Johann Sebastian Bach, especially in Armstrong’s use of counterpoint and variation techniques. At the same time, his music does not adopt a strictly historical idiom but incorporates contemporary harmonic language and rhythmic flexibility. Armstrong’s engagement with mathematics and science has been noted as a formative influence on his artistic outlook, and biographical profiles describe his approach to music as shaped by his interdisciplinary education.

Armstrong has received multiple awards specifically recognizing his achievements in composition. In 2001, he received a $10,000 Davidson Fellows Scholarship from the Davidson Institute for Talent Development. In his youth he was a repeated recipient of the Morton Gould Young Composer Award, presented by the American Society of Composers, Authors and Publishers (ASCAP).

Armstrong performs his own compositions in concerts, and his dual role as composer–performer positions him within a tradition of musician-composers extending from the 18th and 19th centuries to the present day. Among notable interpretations of his compositions by others,

- the Pacific Symphony performed Armstrong's Symphony No. 1, Celebration in March 2000;
- a string quartet commissioned by the Leipzig Gewandhaus Orchestra was premiered by the Szymanowski String Quartet in 2011;
- the piano trio Stop laughing, we're rehearsing! was recorded with Andrej Bielow and Brendel for GENUIN in 2012;
- the Akademie für Alte Musik Berlin performed a fortepiano concerto by Armstrong in 2015;
- percussionist Alexej Gerassimez's premiere of Armstrong's percussion concerto with Konzerthausorchester Berlin in 2017, the premiere of his Canonic Sonata at Bachwoche Ansbach in 2021, and the premiere of Flüchtlinge with soprano Hanna-Elisabeth Müller in 2023 were broadcast on German nationwide radio;
- Trio Gaspard premiered and recorded Revêtements in 2024, described by Gramophone (magazine) as "refracting piano trio and folk music tropes through a modernist prism".

=== List of compositions ===
Title	Scoring	Date	Notes
=== Orchestra ===
Zeitreise	Orchestra	2014	Commissioned by Philharmonic Orchestra Kiel; Premiere: 22 June 2014, Kiel; Georg Fritzsch (conductor); Published by Edition Peters
Andante	Orchestra	2012	Commissioned by Musikkollegium Winterthur
Celebration, Symphony in F	Orchestra	2000	
=== Concertante ===
We are all visitors, Double Concerto	Violin, piano, and string orchestra	2023	Commissioned by Fränkischer Sommer; Premiere: 26 August 2023, Schwabach; 27 August 2023, Rothenburg ob der Tauber; Franziska Hölscher, Ensemble Resonanz
Konzert für Schlagzeug und Orchester	Percussion and orchestra	2017	Commissioned by Festspiele Mecklenburg-Vorpommern; Premiere: 22 July 2017, Stolpe; Alexej Gerassimez, Konzerthausorchester Berlin; Shiyeon Sung (conductor)
Konzert für Hammerklavier und Streicher	Fortepiano and strings	2015	Commissioned by BASF-Kulturmanagement; Dedicated to Alfred Brendel; Premiere: 27 January 2015, Ludwigshafen; Akademie für Alte Musik
Triple Concerto	Violin, cello, piano, and orchestra	2014	Commissioned by Hannoversche Orchestervereinigung; Premiere: 17 May 2014, Hannover
Concerto for Clarinet and Orchestra	Clarinet and orchestra	2010	Commissioned by Frankfurter BachKonzerte; Premiere: 4 November 2010, Frankfurt Alte Oper; Paul Meyer, Zurich Chamber Orchestra
=== Chamber ===
4 Bagatelles über Stille Nacht	Clarinet and organ	2024	Commissioned by festival “gruber & more”; Premiere: 27 April 2024, Hallein; Matthias Schorn
Revêtements	Piano trio	2023	Commissioned by Trio Gaspard
4 Preludes	Piano quintet	2022	Commissioned by Frankfurter Museumsgesellschaft; Premiere: 19 January 2023, Alte Oper Frankfurt; Aris Quartett
Fast zu ernst	Piano trio	2021	Commissioned by Klavierfestival Ruhr; Dedicated to Alfred Brendel (90th anniversary); Premiere: 21 September 2021, Düsseldorf; Andrej Bielow, Adrian Brendel
Canonic Sonata	Oboe, violin, and piano	2021	Commissioned by Bachwoche Ansbach; Premiere: 1 August 2021
Abschied	2 pianos	2021	Commissioned by Movimentos Festwochen; Premiere: 8 April 2018
Clarinet Quintet after a Mozart Fragment	Clarinet and string quartet	2017	Commissioned by BASF
Aria	Cello and piano	2013	
Der kranke Mond	Violin and cello	2012	Commissioned by Movimentos Festwochen
Time flies like an arrow	Violin, cello and piano	2011	Commissioned by Klavier-Festival Ruhr
String Quartet	String quartet	2011	Commissioned by Gewandhaus zu Leipzig; Premiere: 12 February 2011; Szymanowski Quartet
Quintet	Oboe, clarinet, horn, bassoon, and piano	2009	Commissioned by International Chamber Music Festival The Hague
Stop laughing, we're rehearsing	Violin, cello, and piano	2009	Commissioned by Music at Plush
Breaking Symmetry	Horn, violin, viola, and cello	2008	
Who Stole My Wasabi?	Cello and piano	2008	Commissioned by Music at Plush
Struwwelpeter	Viola or violin and piano	2006	
Landscapes	String quartet and piano	2006	
Birds by the Pond	String quartet	2004	
=== Piano solo ===
Un fil d’oubli	Piano	2019	Inspired by Mozart KV399; Commissioned by Konzerthaus Dortmund
Études de dessin	Piano	2017	Composed for Felix Mendelssohn Bartholdy Hochschulwettbewerb 2018
Rondeau	Piano	2014	Commissioned by Mosel Musikfestival
Snowfall Fading	Piano	2013	Published by Edition Peters
Impressions	Piano (left hand)	2013	Published by Edition Peters
Miniatures	Piano	2012	Frühlingserwachen, Lexa, Lenz: Variations on "Volare", Origami
Fantasy on B-A-C-H	Piano	2011	Commissioned by Sommerliche Musiktage Hitzacker
Half of One, Six Dozen of the Other	Piano	2010	Commissioned and premiered by Till Fellner
Message in a Cabbage	Piano	2008	
Reflections	Piano	2007	
Portraits	Piano	2006	
Fantasia and Toccata	Piano	2005	
Sweet Remembrance	Piano	2005	
Transformation	Piano	2002	
A Spooky Night	Piano	2002	
Six Short Pieces	Piano	2001	
The Triumph of a Butterfly	Piano	2001	
Homage to Bach	Piano	2000	
A Thunderstorm	Piano	2000	
Five Elements	Piano	1999	
Chicken Sonata	Piano	1998	
=== Vocal ===
Flüchtlinge	Soprano, violin, and piano	2023	Text: Emma Bonn (1938); Commissioned by Musiktage Feldafing; Premiere: 23 July 2023; Recorded by Bayerischer Rundfunk
Songs upon poems by Guy de Muyser	Mezzo-soprano and piano	2023	Premiere: 6 February 2023, Banque de Luxembourg
Neue Struwwelpeter-Geschichten	Mezzo-soprano and piano	2023	Texts by students of Lessing-Gymnasium Frankfurt; Premiere: 22 May 2023
Traum vom Glück	SATB chorus; mezzo-soprano and piano	2022	Text: Ulla Hahn; Premiere: 19 September 2022, Hamburg
Lieder nach Texten von Ulla Hahn	Voice(s) and piano	2022	Schöne Landschaft, Es bleibt heute Abend noch lange hell, Zusammen - Weiter - Kommen, Jedes Teilchen, das auf der Erde weilte, Die gefräßigen Rosen Commissioned by Schubertiade; Premiere: 5 May 2022, Hohenems
Lieder nach Texten von Ulla Hahn	Mezzo-soprano, baritone, viola, and piano	2019	Selig sind die Enttäuschten, Wie es anfängt, Besichtigung, Zurechtgerückt, Auslösen, Reprise, Morgenlob (V) Commissioned by Schubertiade; Premiere: 30 April 2019; Recorded by ORF
Mozart-Lieder	Voice and piano	2016	An die Einsamkeit, Heidenröslein, Das Veilchen, Lied der Trennung, An Chloe Commissioned by Mozartfest Würzburg

== Discography ==
In September 2008, Armstrong recorded Bach, Liszt and Mozart for Plushmusic.tv.

In 2011, the film Set the Piano Stool on Fire by Mark Kidel was released on DVD, chronicling the relationship between pianist Alfred Brendel and Armstrong.

In April 2012, GENUIN released a CD by Armstrong, Brendel, and Andrej Bielow of piano trios by Haydn, Beethoven, Armstrong and Liszt.

On September 27, 2013, Sony Music Entertainment released Kit Armstrong's album "Bach, Ligeti, Armstrong". On the CD he presents his own transcriptions of 12 Chorale Preludes by J.S. Bach, his own composition and homage "Fantasy on B-A-C-H", and parts of the Musica ricercata by Ligeti.

In November 2015, Sony Music Entertainment released "Liszt: Symphonic Scenes", a solo piano CD by Armstrong.

Kit Armstrong's 2016 recital in Amsterdam Concertgebouw, featuring music by William Byrd, Jan Pieterszoon Sweelinck, John Bull, and Johann Sebastian Bach was recorded as a DVD and released by Unitel.

Concerts at the Margravial Opera House in Bayreuth in 2018 and 2019 were published on DVD, featuring music by Liszt, Mozart and Wagner.

In Byrd & Bull: The Visionaries of Piano Music, a double CD set of works by William Byrd and John Bull produced by Deutsche Grammophon in 2021, Armstrong "presents pieces that were conceived as much more than diversions for an elite or adornments to ritual, span everything from meditative elegies and rousing marches to virtuoso variations on popular melodies and Bull's ingenious canons." The publication was met with critical acclaim from BBC Music and The Times among others, in addition to the winning the year-end awards Top 10 Classical Recordings of the Year and Critics' Choice by Presto Music and Gramophone, respectively.

In 2023, the film, 1520-2020 : A Musical Odyssey - Une Odyssée Musicale - Eine musikalische Reise by Francis Marcellet, Armstrong, piano solo (2 DVDs Damis Films)

Renaud Capuçon and Kit Armstrong recorded Mozart’s sonatas for piano and violin for Deutsche Grammophon in a 4-CD set released in June 2023.

== Bibliography ==
- « Armstrong, la vie, quelle histoire ? » in 88 notes pour piano solo, Jean-Pierre Thiollet, Neva Editions, 2015, p. 215-216. ISBN 978-2-3505-5192-0
