= Mondrepuis =

- Commune
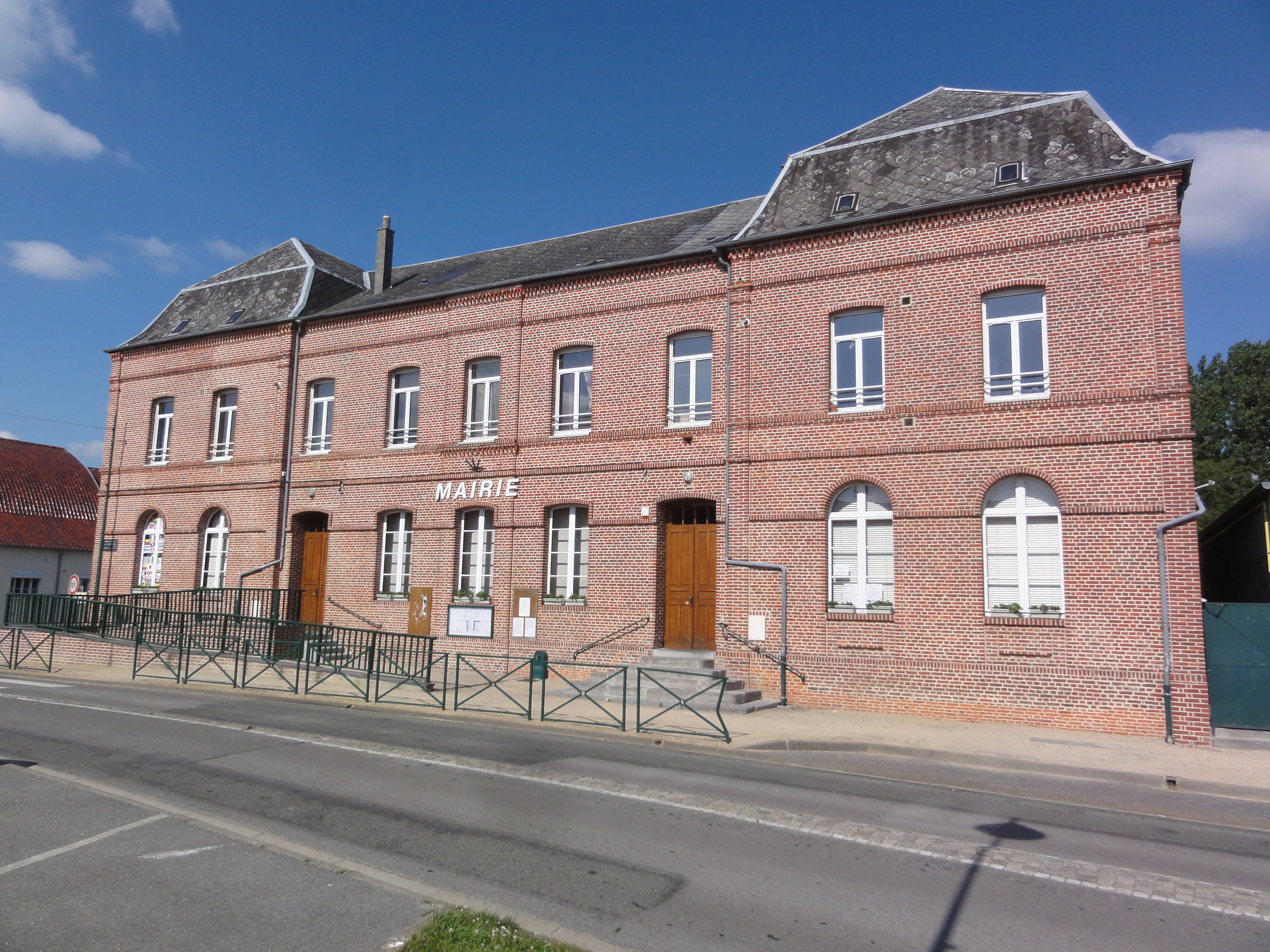
- The town hall of Mondrepuis
- Location of Mondrepuis
- Location within France Location within Hauts-de-France
- Coordinates: 49°57′50″N 4°03′21″E
- Country: France
- Region: Hauts-de-France
- Department: Aisne
- Arrondissement: Vervins
- Canton: Hirson
- Intercommunality: CC Trois Rivières

Government
  - Mayor (2026–32): Fabien Coquelet
- Area^{1}: 20.33 km^{2} (7.85 sq mi)
- Elevation: 195 m (640 ft)
- Highest elevation: 238 m (781 ft)
- Lowest elevation: 144 m (472 ft)
- Population (2023): 1,028
  - Density: 50.57/km^{2} (131.0/sq mi)
- Time zone: UTC+01:00 (CET)
  - Summer (DST): UTC+02:00 (CEST)
- INSEE/Postal code: 02495 /02500
- ^{1} French Land Register data, which excludes lakes, ponds, glaciers > 1 km^{2} (0.386 sq mi or 247 acres) and river estuaries.

Mondrepuis (French pronunciation: [mɔ̃dʁəpɥi]) is a commune in the Aisne department in Hauts-de-France in northern France.

== Population ==
Historical population
Year	Pop.	±% p.a.
1968	1,121	—
1975	1,005	−1.55%
1982	972	−0.48%
1990	1,006	+0.43%
1999	941	−0.74%
2007	1,008	+0.86%
2012	999	−0.18%
2017	1,040	+0.81%
2023	1,028	−0.19%
Source: INSEE

== See also ==
- Communes of the Aisne department
- Alfred Desmasures
