= Orange County School of the Arts =

Public charter school in Santa Ana, California

Orange County School of the Arts (OCSA)
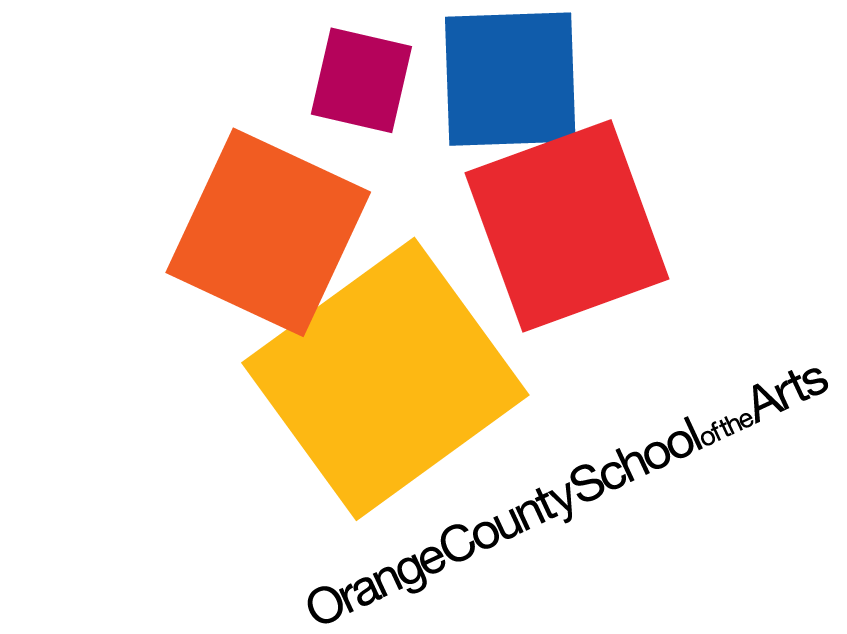

Location
- 1010 N. Main Street; Santa Ana, California 92701; United States; 33.753864°N 117.86798°W

Information
- Type: Public charter school
- Motto: We Are OCSA
- Established: 1987
- Founder: Ralph Opacic
- Sister school: California School of the Arts - San Gabriel Valley (CSArts-SGV)
- School district: Governed by the Orange County Board of Education
- Dean: Becca Freeland (Student Services); Abbe Levine (Operations); Shelley Stanphill (Instruction); Maria Lazarova (Arts); Lauren Reynolds (Special Education); Heather Williams (Student Culture)
- Executive Director: Teren Shaffer
- Faculty: 100
- Grades: 7–12
- Enrollment: 2,439
- Campus: Urban
- Colors: yellow, orange, red, purple, blue
- Newspaper: Evolution
- Yearbook: Dreamscape
- Website: www.ocsarts.net

The Orange County School of the Arts (OCSA, /ˈoʊʃə/ OH-shə), (Note: Retained from a pronunciation of the previous acronym for the previous name of the school (respectively "Orange County High School of the Arts" and "OCHSA").) formerly known as the Orange County High School of the Arts (OCHSA) until 2012, is a 7th–12th grade public charter school located in downtown Santa Ana, California. The school caters to middle and high school students with talents in the performing, visual, literary arts, culinary arts and more. The educational program prepares students for higher education institutions or employment in the professional arts industry. In 2010, the school's academic and arts programs were ranked with silver medal status in the U.S. News & World Report "Best High Schools" list.

== History ==
OCSA was originally founded in 1987 as the Orange County High School of the Performing Arts in Los Alamitos, California through a grant from the state Board of Education. The school's founder, Ralph Opacic, then the vocal music director at Los Alamitos High School, co-wrote the grant application with Jean Cross, a project specialist for the school district. The starting class for the 1987-88 school year contained only 120 students and 6 staff members. By 1998, enrollment had grown to 485 students and 60 arts teachers. The school was well-funded through private donations to the OCSHA Foundation but available space was limited at the Los Alamitos school location, so Opacic began to search for a larger campus outside the district. In 2000, the school reorganized as a new public charter school in the Santa Ana Unified School District and included both academic classes and art conservatories. The city of Santa Ana, California welcomed the school in an effort to revitalize the downtown area. The new campus was developed in a seven-story former bank building and a 1922 mission-style church which was then converted into a small auditorium. The first year at its permanent location enrollment jumped to 900 students. In the summer of 2012, the name of the school was changed from OCHSA (Orange County High School of the Arts) to OCSA (Orange County School of the Arts) to recognize the school's 7 and 8 middle school grades.

== Academics ==
Students attend academic courses under a block schedule system with three 85-minute academic classes per day alternating each day for a total of six classes. Honors classes are offered as well as Advanced Placement classes. Elective courses include Acting, Ceramics, Improv, Graphic Design, Zoology, Vocal Ensemble, Beginner Piano, Journalism, and Photography.

OCSA's 2012 Academic Performance Index (API) score of 908 ranked the school as one of the top five ranked high schools in Orange County and in the top 10 percent in California.

OCSA was designated a National Blue Ribbon School in 2006 by the U.S. Department of Education as one of 35 California schools and five public schools in Orange County. OCSA has received the Exceptional Charter School award by the National Association of Special Education Teachers every year from 2017 to 2026.

In 2021, 95% of OCSA alumni continued on to college, with 76% going on to a 4-year university, 13% going to a 2-year university with plans to transfer to a 4-year university and 11% going directly into the workforce. Students must maintain a minimum 2.0 GPA to continue participating in their artistic studies.

== Arts ==
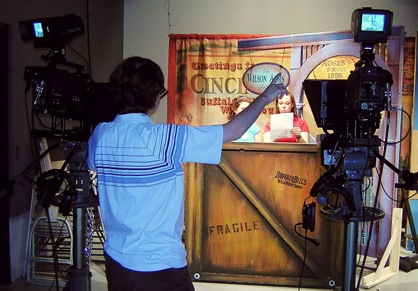
Art Attack Live set redecorated to fit the campus' western-themed spirit week.

On Monday through Thursday after the academic schedule ends, students attend two 70-minute blocks in their chosen art conservatory. The 17 different conservatories include: Acting, Arts & Enterprise, Ballet & Contemporary Dance, Ballet Folklórico, Ballroom Dance, Classical Voice, Commercial Dance, Creative Writing, Culinary Arts & Hospitality, Design & Media, Film & Television, Instrumental Music, Integrated Arts, Musical Theatre, Popular Music, Production & Design, and Visual Arts.

In 2026, OCSA received a California Exemplary Arts Education Award from the California Department of Education. The school has received numerous awards from the Arts Schools Network including the 2023 Arts Innovation award; the Community Partnership award in 2012, 2013 and 2015; the Outstanding Alumni Achievement Award in 2025 (RJ Higton), in 2022 (Dante Basco), 2019 (Abbe Levine), 2017 (Krysta Rodriguez), 2014 (Lauren Lim Jackson) and 2012 (Brett Egan); and four Teacher of the Year awards (2013, 2018, 2020, 2022).

== Notable students and alumni ==
- Nomi Abadi — musician
- Kit Armstrong — classical pianist
- Scott Aukerman – writer and comedian
- Shannon Bae — singer and member of Pristin
- Dante Basco — actor
- Dion Basco — actor
- Drake Bell — actor and musician
- Ashley Benson — actress
- Stephanie J. Block — Tony Award-winner
- Kara Crane — actress
- Chad Doreck — actor
- Susan Egan — actress (also former OCSA artistic director)
- Michael Fishman — actor
- Lauren German — actress
- Vanessa Hudgens — actress and singer (attended OCSA 7th grade only)
- Dinah Jane — singer and member of Fifth Harmony
- Allison Mack — actress who served 21 months for crimes related to the sex trafficking cult NXIVM
- Taryn Manning — actress
- Gavin Leatherwood — actor and musician
- Joe and Luke McGarry — twin musicians/graphic artists
- Grace McLean — actress and singer
- Lindsay Mendez — Tony Award-winning actress
- Emma Milani — actress
- Matthew Morrison — actor, singer and dancer
- Pedro Pascal – actor
- Monique Powell – vocalist
- Malia Pyles — actress
- Michael Repper — conductor
- Krysta Rodriguez — actress
- Matthew Shaffer — actor and dancer
- Columbus Short — actor and choreographer
- Justice Smith — actor
- Nikki SooHoo — actress
- China Soul — singer-songwriter
- Nicholas Urie — composer
- Anneliese van der Pol — actress
- Daniel Zolghadri — actor
- Ricky Shen — singer, member of And2ble and formerly of Zerobaseone
