= Rick Stromoski =

American cartoonist (born 1958)

- Born: December 25, 1958 (age 67) Edison, New Jersey, U.S.
- Areas: Cartoonist, Artist
- Notable works: Mullets; Soup to Nutz
- Awards: National Cartoonist Society Greeting Card Award, 1995, 1998; NCS Gag Cartoon Award, 1999
- Spouse: Danna

Rick Stromoski (born December 25, 1958) is an American cartoonist whose work includes the syndicated comic strips Mullets and Soup to Nutz.

Stromoski grew up in Edison, New Jersey, part of a family of twelve children, and graduated from Edison High School in 1977. He is a self-taught artist who was influenced by the artists of Mad magazine, including Jack Davis, Don Martin, Sergio Aragonés, Paul Coker, Dave Berg, Al Jaffee, and Mort Drucker. His favorite comic strips were Andy Capp and Smokey Stover.

Stromoski's career started out in the greeting card industry. He illustrated books for such publishers as Macillan, Workman, and Random House.

Stromoski's daily strip Soup to Nutz was syndicated by the Newspaper Enterprise Association from 2000 to 2018. He teamed up with fellow cartoonist Steve McGarry to produce the syndicated strip Mullets from November 24, 2003, to January 15, 2005.

Stromoski was president of the National Cartoonist Society (NCS) from 2005 to 2007.

== Awards ==
Stromoski was the first cartoonist to twice win the NCS Greeting Card Award, doing so in 1995 and 1998. He also won the NCS Gag Cartoon Award for 1999, and was nominated for the organization's Book and Illustration Award for 1999.

== Bibliography ==
- Face the Facts... 40 Happens! (Trisar, 1994)
- Face the Facts... 50 Happens! Humor Book (Trisar, 1994)
- Madame Wrinkleski Predicts: A Women's Guide to Getting Older (Trisar, 1995)
- Bad Dogs: A Collection of Canine Pranks and Practical Jokes (Contemporary Books, 1995)
- Bad Cats: A Collection of Feline Funnies and Kitty Tomfoolery (McGraw Hill, 1995)
- Soup to Nutz: The First Course (Andrews McMeel Publishing, 2012)
- Soup to Nutz A Second Helping (Andrews McMeel Publishing, 2013)
