= Mullets (comic strip) =

Comic strip by Rick Stromoski and Steve McGarry

- Author(s): Steve McGarry
- Illustrator(s): Rick Stromoski
- Current status/schedule: Concluded daily & Sunday strip
- Launch date: November 24, 2003
- End date: January 15, 2005
- Syndicate(s): Universal Press Syndicate
- Genre(s): Humor

Mullets was an American comic strip by Rick Stromoski and Steve McGarry. The comic revolved around the characters Kevin and Scab, two dim-witted friends (with mullet haircuts) who shared a trailer and worked at a place called Mildew's Hardware Store.
