= Soup to Nutz =

American comic strip

- Author: Rick Stromoski
- Current status/schedule: Concluded daily & Sunday strip
- Launch date: March 27, 2000
- End date: May 26, 2018
- Syndicate(s): Newspaper Enterprise Association (Andrews McMeel Syndication)
- Publisher: Andrews McMeel Publishing
- Genre: Humor

Soup to Nutz is a daily comic strip drawn by Rick Stromoski. It centers on the Nutz family, particularly the three children in the family.

The comic launched in March 2000, went into reprints on March 5, 2018, and ended its run on May 28, 2018. It was syndicated by the Newspaper Enterprise Association.

== Characters ==
- Roy Nutz: The patriarch of the Nutz family, a typical blue-collar working man. The short-tempered head of the Catholic household enjoys watching TV and drinking beer.
- Pat Nutz: Roy's wife.
- Roy Nutz, Jr., aka Royboy: The oldest of the three Nutz children. Huskily built, he is rather slow witted, overeats, and enjoys sports.
- Babs Nutz: The middle of the three Nutz children is the only girl, and the smartest. She is able to manipulate both Royboy and Andrew to her advantage.
- Andrew Nutz: The youngest of the three Nutz children. Andrew enjoys playing with dolls, and is bossed around on a regular basis by both of his older siblings.

== Collections ==
- Soup to Nutz: The First Course (2003); ISBN 0-7407-3946-8
- Soup to Nutz A Second Helping (2013); ISBN 1-6262-0455-1
