= Festival Supreme =

Festival Supreme was a comedy music festival held in Los Angeles hosted by Jack Black and Kyle Gass as Tenacious D. The first event was held in 2013 at the Santa Monica Pier and 2014, 2015 and 2016 saw the festival take place at the Shrine Auditorium. The festival has featured names such as Conan O'Brien as well as David Cross and Sarah Silverman.
