= Construction of the Lackawanna Cut-Off =

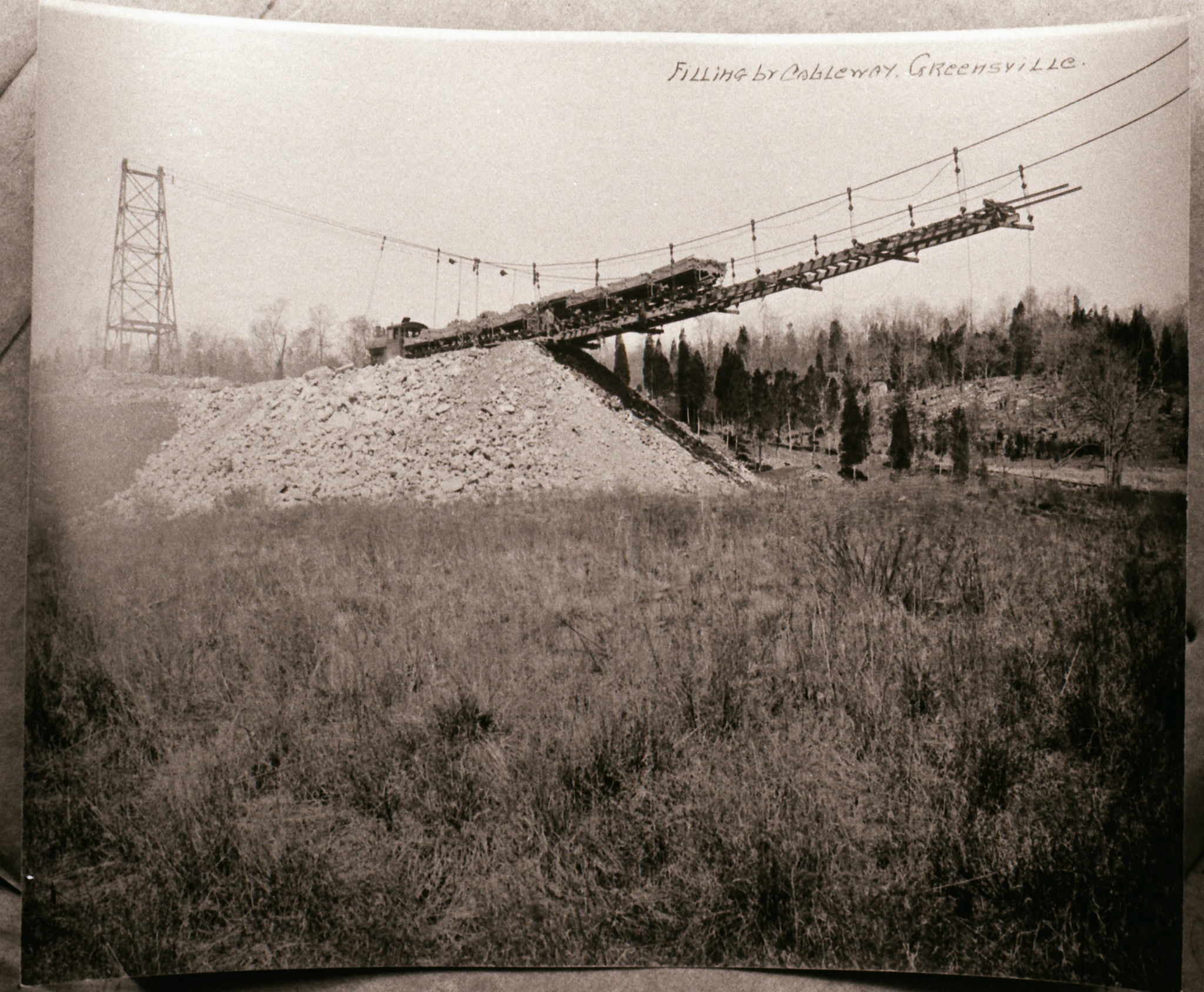
This 1910 photo shows how much of the Lackawanna Cut-Off's Pequest Fill was created: by dumping small skip cars of dirt from a suspended railway.

The construction of the Lackawanna Cut-Off, a 28.45-mile (45.79 km) railroad line that shortened a key route for the Delaware, Lackawanna, and Western Railroad, took place in New Jersey from 1905 to 1911.

After running for several decades, the Lackawanna Cut-Off became inactive, but in this century, the Lackawanna Cut-Off Restoration Project has brought parts of it back into operation.

== Planning (1905–1908) ==
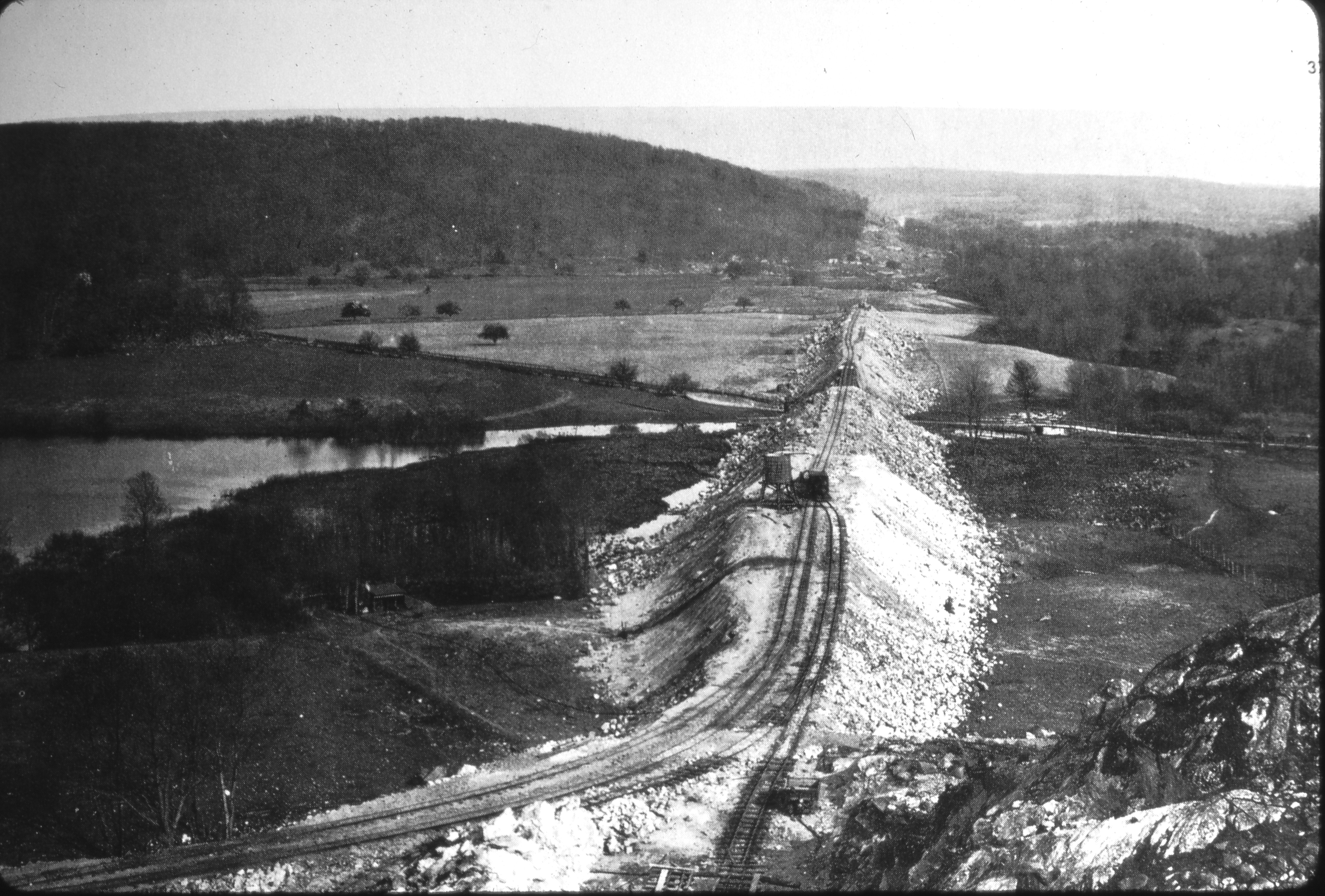
A May 1909 view of the Wharton Fill looking east from atop Roseville Tunnel, ten months into construction

During 1905–06, 14 routes were surveyed (labeled with letters of the alphabet), including several that would have required long tunnels. On September 1, 1906, a route without tunnels was chosen. This New Road (Route "M") would run from the crest of the watershed at Lake Hopatcong at Port Morris Junction to 2 mi (3.2 km) south of the Delaware Water Gap on the Pennsylvania side of the Delaware River at Slateford Junction.

At 28.45 miles (45.9 km), the line would be about 11 mi (18 km) shorter than the 39.6-mile (63.7 km) Old Road. The new route would have only 15 curves – 42 fewer curves than the Old Road, the equivalent of more than four complete circles of curvature – which increased speeds and decreased running time – more so for freight, but for passenger trains as well. The ruling grade was cut in half from 1.1% to 0.55%. The new line would also be built without railroad crossings to avoid collisions with automobiles and horse-drawn vehicles.

DL&W chief engineer George G. Ray oversaw the project. Given the size and remote location of the project, Assistant Chief Engineer F.L. Wheaton was assigned the task of overseeing the construction in person.

The project was divided into seven sections, one for each contracting company. Sections 3–6 were 5 miles (8 km) each; Sections 1–2 and 7 were of varying lengths. (Theoretically, to divide the 28.45-mile (46 km) line evenly, the seven sections should have been just over four miles each, but that would have placed the Pequest Fill entirely within Section 3 and the two viaducts within Section 7.) The amount of work per mile varied; the largest share apparently went to David W. Flickwir, whose Section 3 included Roseville Tunnel and the eastern half of the Pequest Fill. (During construction, Lackawanna Railroad Chief Engineer Lincoln Bush would leave the railroad and join Flickwir's construction company, which would take the name Flickwir & Bush.)

== Construction (1908–1911) ==
Uncertain national economic conditions in 1907 delayed the official start of construction until August 1, 1908.

To accommodate the labor gangs, deserted farmhouses were converted to barracks, with tent camps providing additional shelter. These workers, many of whom came from Italy and other foreign countries or other parts of the U.S., were recruited and would move on to other projects after their work on the Cut-Off was completed. These workers were viewed with suspicion by the local populace in Warren and Sussex counties, with the town of Blairstown going as far as hiring a watchman at $40 per month for the duration of the project. Supervisory personnel and skilled laborers stayed in local hotels, boarding houses, or local farmhouses, usually at exorbitant rates ($1–2 per day) during the years of construction.

With several thousand men working on the project for over three years, the area all along the Cut-Off, and as far west as Portland, Pennsylvania, benefitted financially.

As many as 30 workers may have lost their lives building the Cut-Off. Most of their names remain unknown because they were registered with their contractor by number only. In 1910, for example, five workers were killed in a single blasting mishap near Port Morris, one of several deadly accidents that involved dynamite. Other workers died in machinery or cable car accidents, or landslides. At least one worker is known to have died of typhoid fever.

Paulinskill Viaduct near Hainesburg is 115 ft (35 m) tall and was the world's largest reinforced concrete structure when built.

The Cut-Off's reinforced concrete structures (73 in all), which consumed 266,885 cubic yards (204,048 m^{3}) of concrete and 735 tons of steel, include underpasses, culverts, and the two large viaducts on the western end of the line.

Some five million pounds (2,300 t) of dynamite were used to blast the cuts on the line. A total of 14,621,100 cubic yards (11,178,600 m^{3}) of fill material was required for the project, more than could be obtained from the project's cuts. This forced the DL&W to purchase 760 acres (310 ha) of farmland for borrow pits. Depending on the fill size, material was dumped from trains that backed out onto track on wooden trestles or suspended on cables between steel towers. During construction, several foreign governments sent representatives on inspection tours to study these new techniques.

The Pequest Fill extended west of Andover to Huntsville, New Jersey. It was at its maximum height 110 feet (34 m) tall and was 3.12 miles (5.0 km) long, requiring 6,625,648 cubic yards (5,065,671 m^{3}) of fill. Armstrong Cut was 100 feet (30 m) deep and 1 mile (1.6 km) long, mostly through solid rock. The line's deepest cut was Colby Cut (immediately west of what would become Roseville Tunnel) at 130 feet (40 m) deep. The tunnel was not in the original plans for the Cut-Off, and in fact much of the cut above the tunnel had already been blasted when in October 1909 unstable anticline rock was encountered, leading to a decision to abandon the cut and to blast what would become a 1,040-foot (320 m) tunnel instead. Contractor Flickwir, whose section included Roseville Tunnel and the eastern half of the Pequest Fill, worked around the clock during the summer of 1911 when construction fell behind schedule.

Stations were built in Greendell, Johnsonburg, and Blairstown; the Greendell area was already being served by the nearby Lehigh & Hudson River Railroad in Tranquility. Interlocking towers were built at Port Morris Junction and Greendell, New Jersey, and Slateford Junction in Pennsylvania.

The final cost of the project was $11,065,512 in 1911. Adjusted for inflation, this sum would be $382,352,959 today. But to build such a project today would cost far more; one 1987 estimate put the modern pricetag at $1 billion or more.

== Sections ==
The work sections were numbered from east to west, with Section 1 starting at the Cut-Off's eastern end at Port Morris Junction, and Section 7 ending at Slateford Junction.

=== Section 1 ===
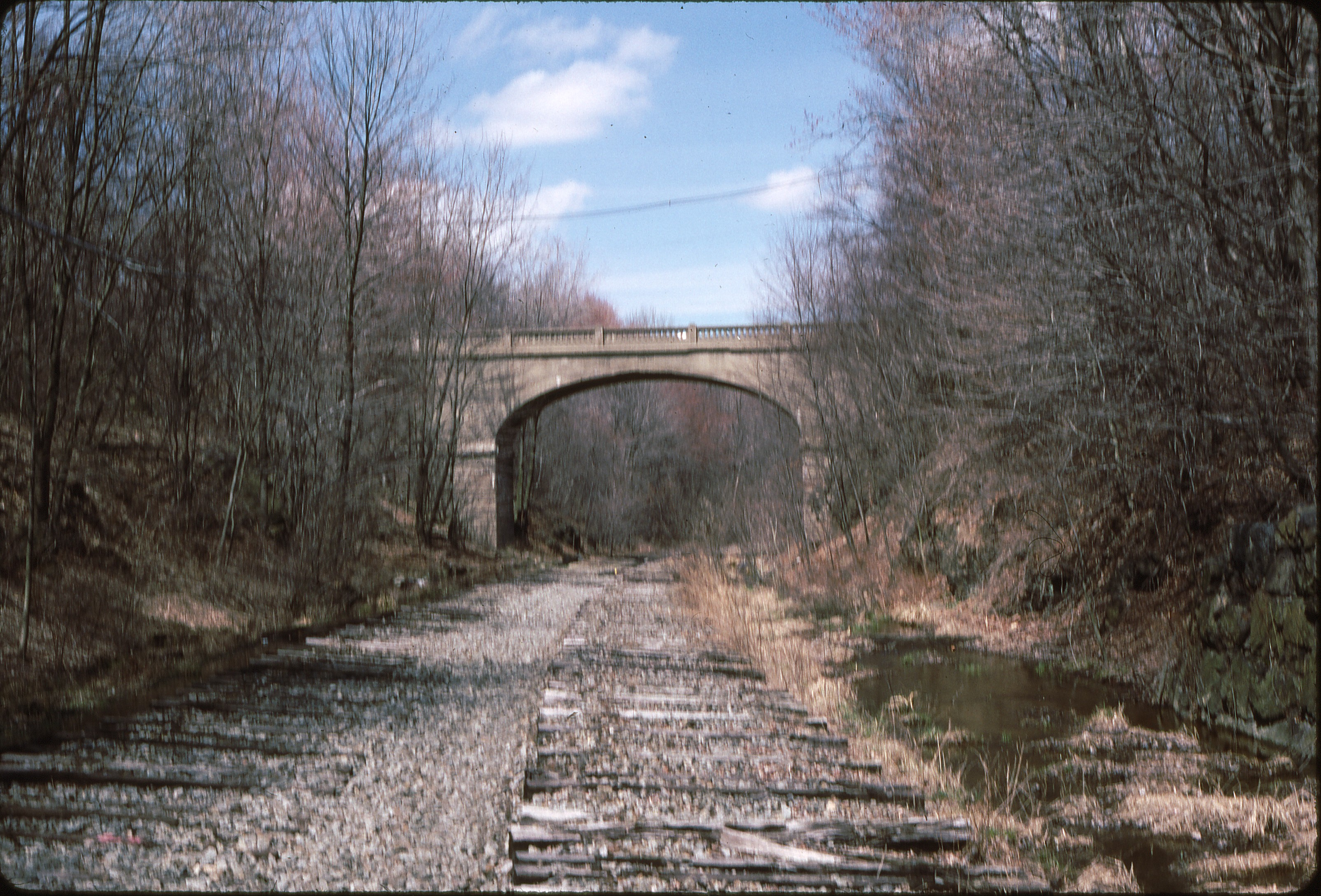
Westward view of the original County Road 605 bridge in April 1989, roughly in the middle of McMickle Cut. When the Cut-Off was single-tracked in 1958, the westbound main line, whose traces are visible at left, was not removed here; instead it became a passing siding that ran nearly 3 miles (5 km) from the western end of McMickle Cut to Port Morris Junction.

Assigned to contractor Timothy Burke, Section 1 ran from mile 45.7 to mile 48.2 of the Lackawanna's main line, stretching from the Cut-off's eastern end at Port Morris Junction to the cut west of the CR 605 bridge. Its features included the tower at Port Morris Junction; made of reinforced concrete, it would operate until 1979.

==== McMickle Cut ====
The longest cut on the Cut-off and the first major earthwork west of Port Morris, McMickle Cut was dug between mileposts 47.1 and 48.1, where Stanhope and Byram Township meet, beginning just west of County Road 602 (site of a future grade crossing) in Hopatcong. Some 600,000 cubic yards of material was removed by dynamite and other methods to make the cut, which is 1.04 miles (1.7 km) long, has an average depth of 29 feet (8.9 m), and a maximum depth of 54 feet (16.6 m).

McMickle Cut is named for John McMickle, who owned most of the land that became the cut.

Sussex County Road 605 (Sparta-Stanhope Road) originally crossed over the Cut-Off on K-07, a one-lane bridge that was completed in 1911. In 2008, K-07 was replaced by a modern two-lane bridge of similar design about midway between the ends of the cut (MP 47.8), near its deepest point, where the line is on a 2° curve (70 mph, 113 km/h). The original bridge, considered functionally obsolete although not functionally deficient, was rehabilitated to carry a hiking trail.

McMickle Cut is within the section of the Cut-Off that is being rebuilt by NJ Transit for rail service to Andover, which is slated to open in 2018. Lack of maintenance has allowed the area to drain increasingly poorly and meet the technical definition of wetlands. It is thought that its creation unearthed an underground stream not on the 1906 survey map.

=== Section 2 ===
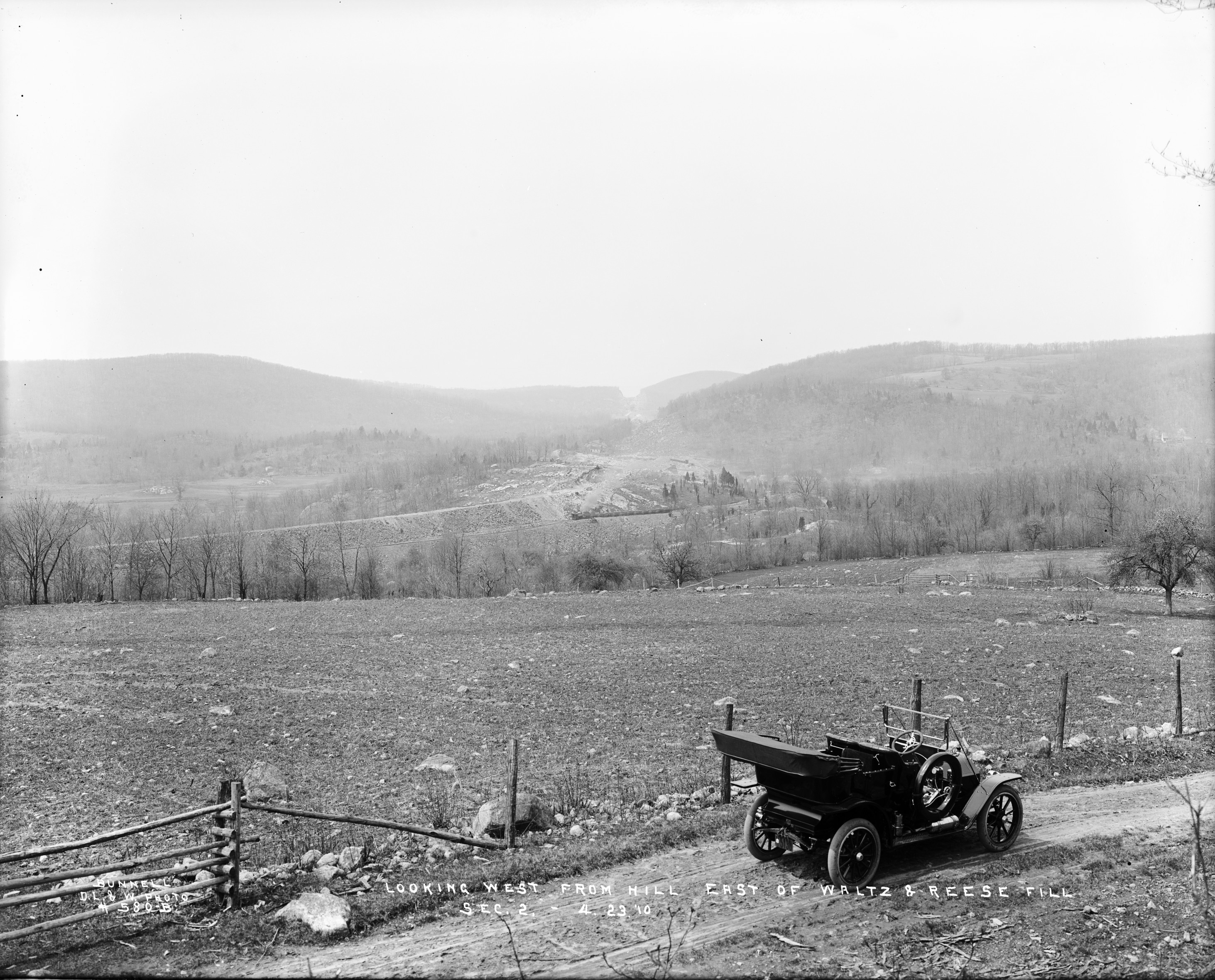
This April 1910 construction photo shows a narrow-gauge train hauling fill material to the top of Waltz & Reece Fill. Waltz & Reece Cut is visible to far left; the top of Roseville Tunnel at center, on the horizon.

Section 2 was awarded to Waltz & Reece Construction Co., and consisted of miles 48.2–50.2, running from a cut west of the CR 605 bridge to Lake Lackawanna, a borrow pit created to build the section. Its major features include:

==== Waltz & Reece Cut ====
The deepest cut on the Cut-Off, the Waltz & Reece Cut is 0.68 miles (1.09 km) long, has an average depth of 37 feet (11 m), and a maximum depth of 114 feet (35 m). It was built by removing 822,400 cubic yards of fill material.

Located between mileposts 48.3 and 49.0 in Byram Township, it sits on a tangent (straight) section of right-of-way just west of McMickle Cut and just east of Bradbury Fill. It is crossed by Sussex County Route 605 on an overhead bridge.

In 2012, a single track was relaid through the cut as part of NJ Transit's plans to restart rail service in or after 2026.

==== Bradbury Fill ====
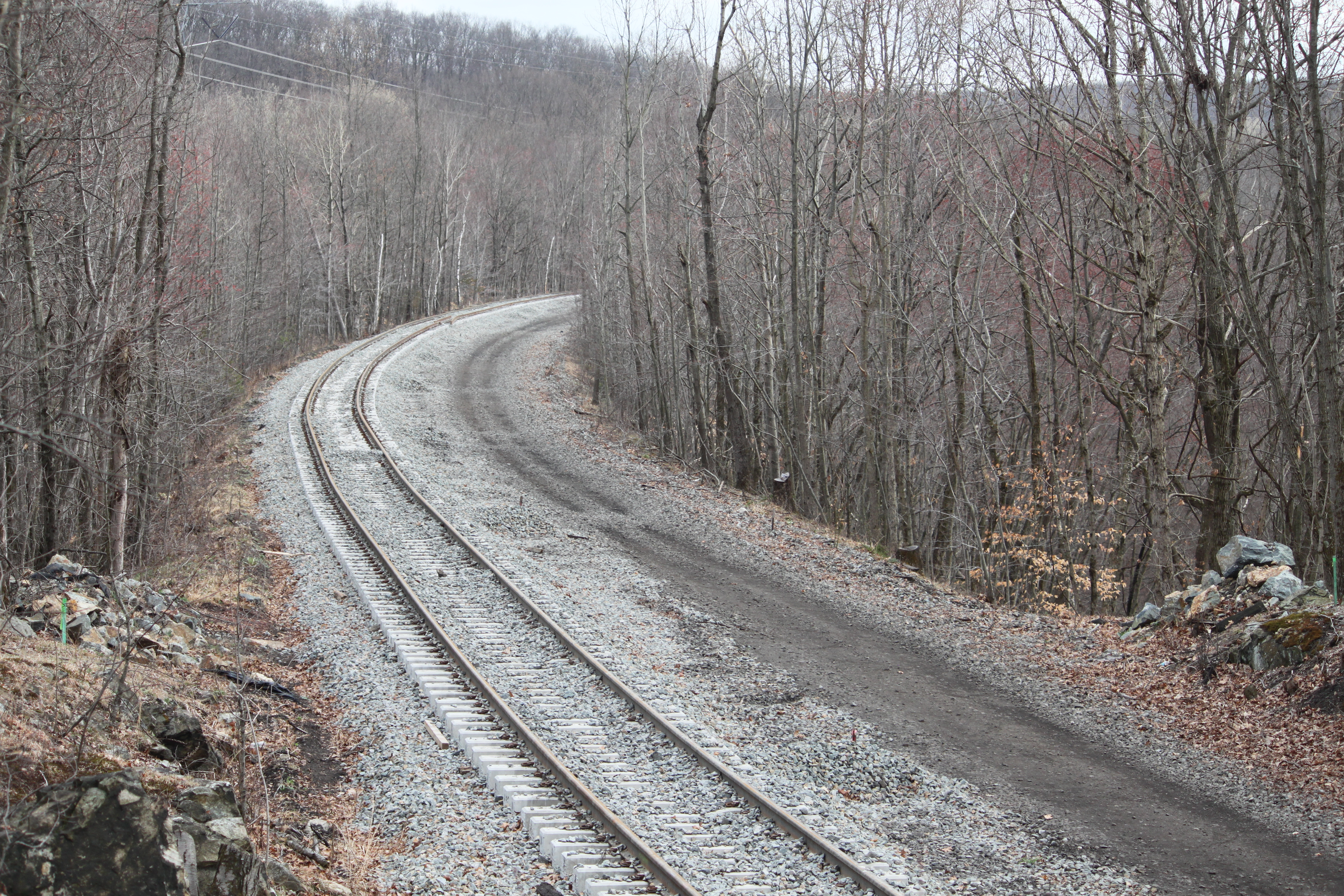
Bradbury Fill looking east from its western end in 2012.

Bradbury Fill sits between mileposts 49.1 and 49.8 in Byram Township. Made of 457,000 cubic yards of fill material, the 0.75-mile (1.1-km) fill averages 24 feet (7.3 m) high and is up to 78 feet (24 m) tall. It carries a 2° curve that permits 70 mph (110 km/h).

Bradbury Fill is named after Mrs. Delia R. Bradbury, who had owned most of the land acquired for the fill.

A single track was relaid through the cut in 2012.

==== Lubber Run Fill ====
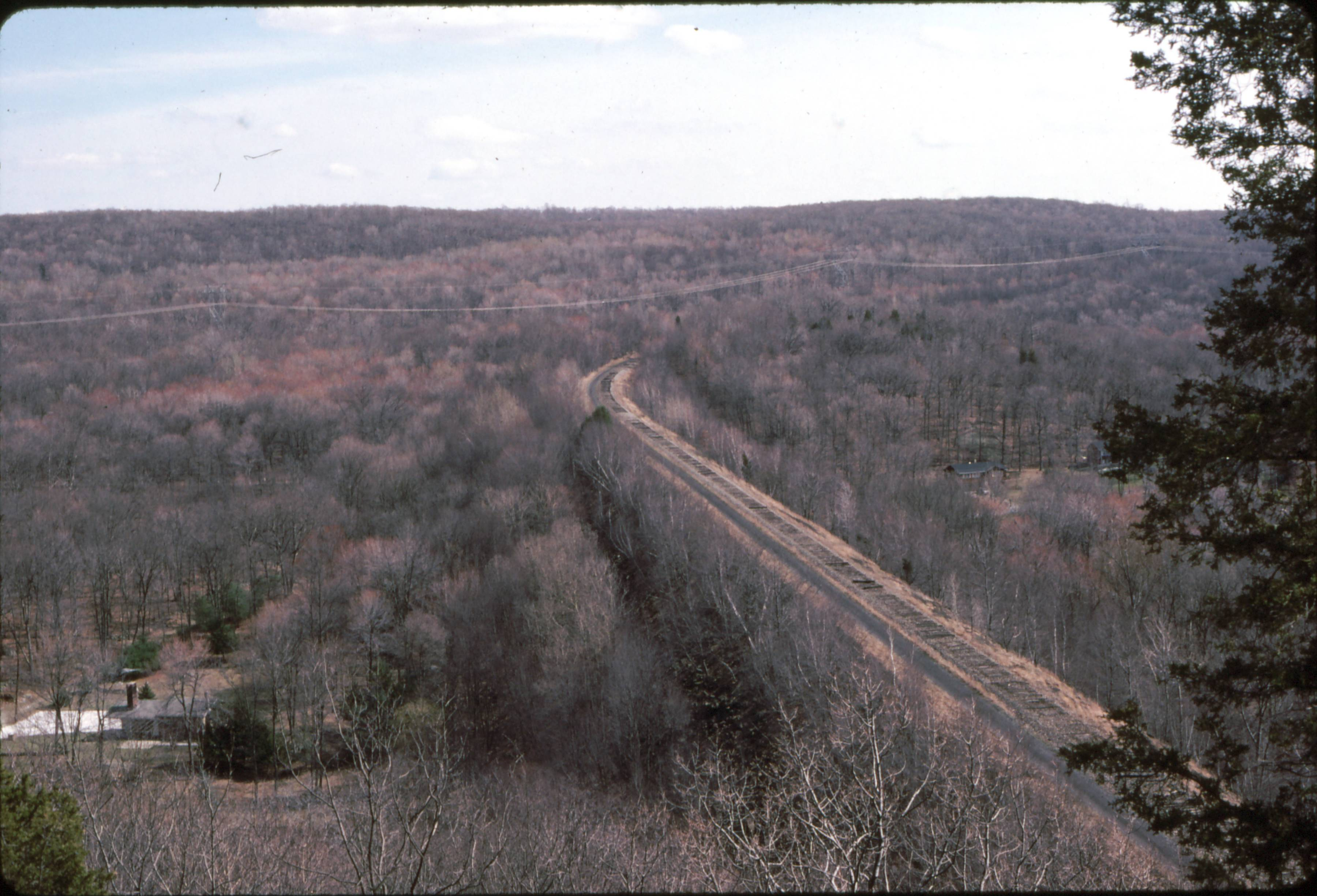
Eastbound view of Lubber Run Fill, spring 1990. Lake Lackawanna is just out of view to the right.

Lubber Run Fill, located between mileposts 50.1 and 50.5 in Byram Township, is 0.40 miles (0.64 km) long, has an average height of 64 feet (20 m), and a maximum height of 98 feet (30 m). Most of its 720,000 cubic yards (550500 m^{3}) of fill material was excavated from the surrounding low-lying area. Lubber Run Fill supports a tangent (straight) section of right-of-way that permits speeds of 70 mph (113 km/h).

Lubber Run Fill is named for the Lubbers Run, which passes under the fill. While some have contended the stream's name was altered from Lubber to Lubbers Run after the construction of the fill, this confusion likely stems from the 1894, 1898, and 1905 US geologic survey maps that identify it as Lubber Run. However, the earlier 1888 USGS map as well as the 1872 Frederick W. Beers maps identify the stream as Lubbers Run, with the "s". A dam was built under the fill on the north side of the embankment, creating Dallis Pond, which flows into Lake Lackawanna.

A single track is to be relaid through the fill.

=== Section 3 ===
Section 3 was assigned to contractor David W. Flickwir, who built miles 50.2–55.8, from Lake Lackawanna to the center of Pequest Fill.

==== Wharton Fill ====
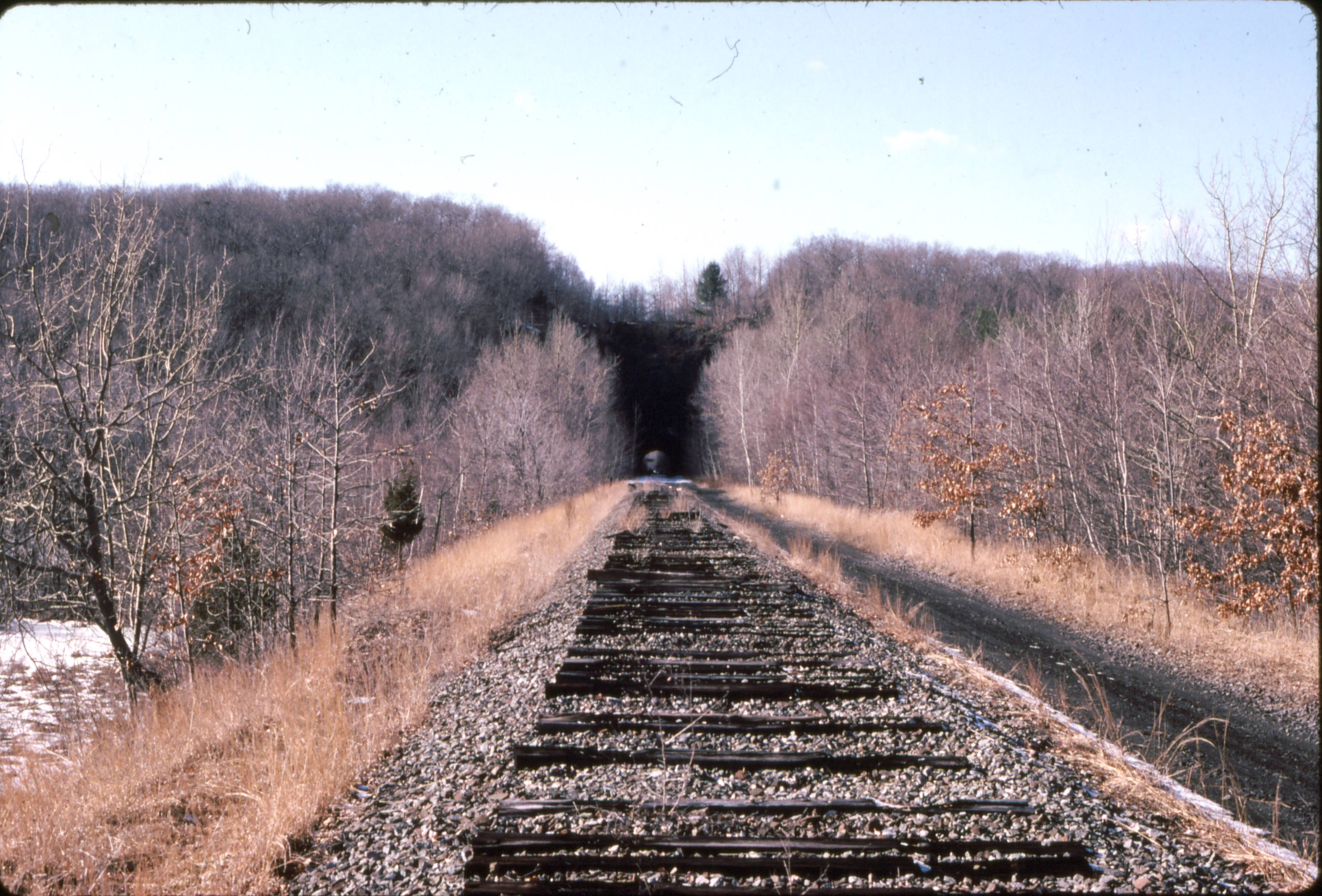
Wharton Fill in 1989, looking west toward Roseville Tunnel.

Wharton Fill sits between mileposts 51.1 and 51.6 in Byram Township just west of Lubber Run Fill and just east of Roseville Tunnel. Most of the material for the 0.5-mile (0.64 km) fill was excavated from the surrounding low-lying area drained by Pumpkin Run; several of the borrow pits have since become ponds. Wharton Fill sits on a tangent (straight) section of right-of-way, permitting 80 mph (113 km/h).

Wharton Fill is named for the Wharton Steel Company, from whom this section of right-of-way was acquired.

This section is scheduled to receive a single track as part of the reactivation of the line, which was abandoned in 1983. NJ Transit rail service is projected to begin no earlier than 2026.

==== Roseville Tunnel ====
Originally planned as a cut, the 1,024-foot (312 m) Roseville Tunnel was bored instead after the rock was found to be too unstable.

==== Colby Cut ====
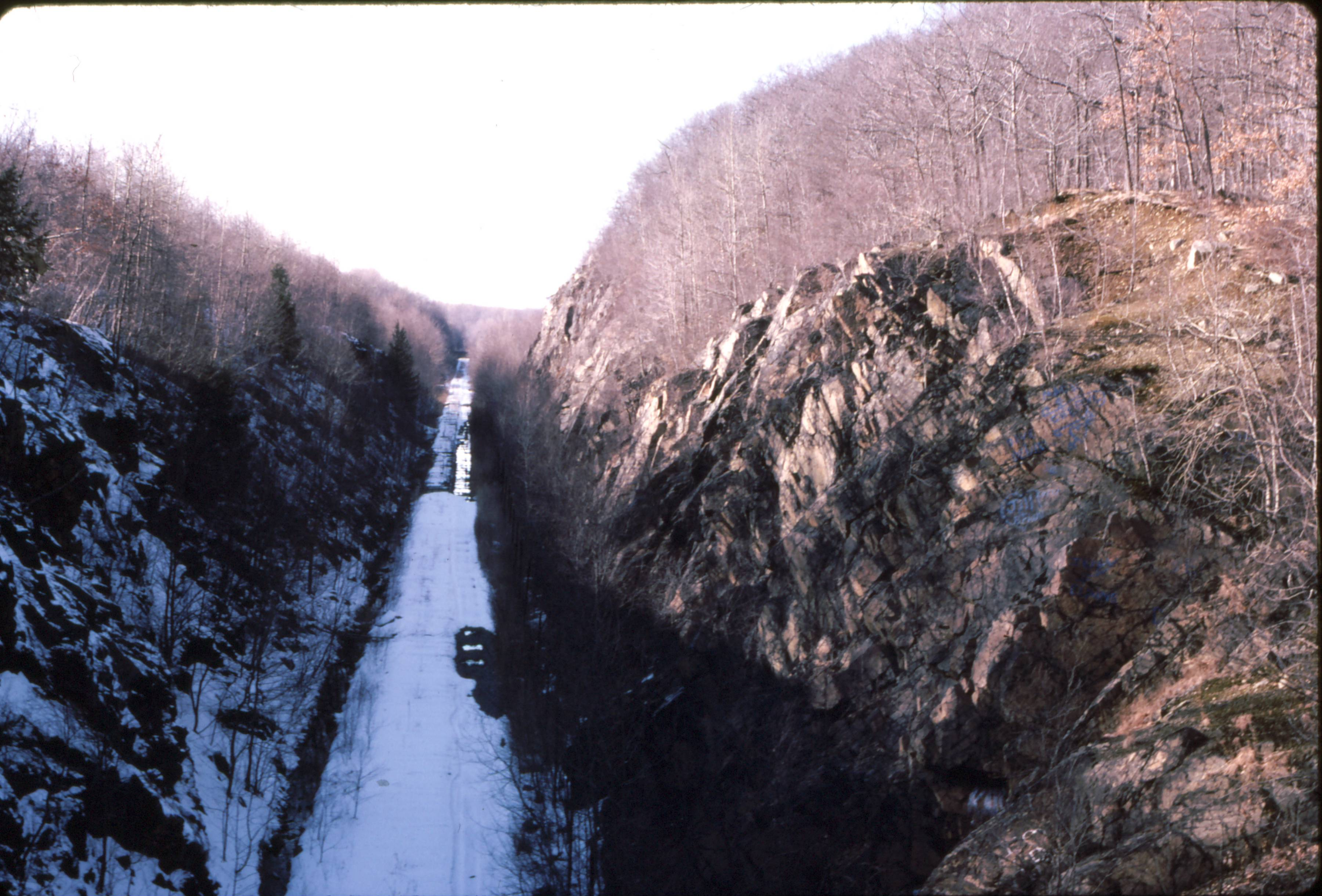
Colby Cut in 1989, looking westbound from above the western portal of Roseville Tunnel.

Located between mileposts 51.8 and 52.3 in Byram Township, Colby Cut was created by removing 462,342 cubic yards of fill material. The cut is 0.53 miles (0.85 km) long, has an average depth of 45 feet (14 m), and a maximum depth of 110 feet (34 m). It sits on a tangent (straight) section of right-of-way, permitting 70 mph (110 km/h).

Colby Cut was named for F.G. Colby, from whom some of the land comprising the cut was acquired. In March 1906, Colby proposed to Lackawanna President William Truesdale that the railroad should put a train station for the Cut-Off on his property, near a "Roseville Lake" (probably Wright's Pond, which is just east and north of the tunnel). Truesdale had Colby contact the chief engineer, Lincoln Bush, to investigate the idea, but the proposal appears to have gone no further.

This section is scheduled to receive a single track as part of the reactivation of the line, which was abandoned in 1982 and the tracks removed in 1984. Colby Cut will be cleared as part of the Roseville Tunnel project by NJ Transit, whose rail service is projected to begin in 2026. The cut will have rockfall mitigation installed as well as improved drainage.

==== Pequest Fill ====
Flickwir built the eastern half of this three-mile (4.8 km) fill, which at its completion was the largest railroad embankment ever built.

=== Section 4 ===
Section 4 was assigned to Walter H. Gahagan: miles 55.8–60.8, from the center of Pequest Fill westward to Johnsonburg station.

==== Pequest Fill ====
Gahagan built the western half of Pequest Fill.

==== Greendell station ====
A station and siding tower were built at Greendell of reinforced concrete.

=== Section 5 ===
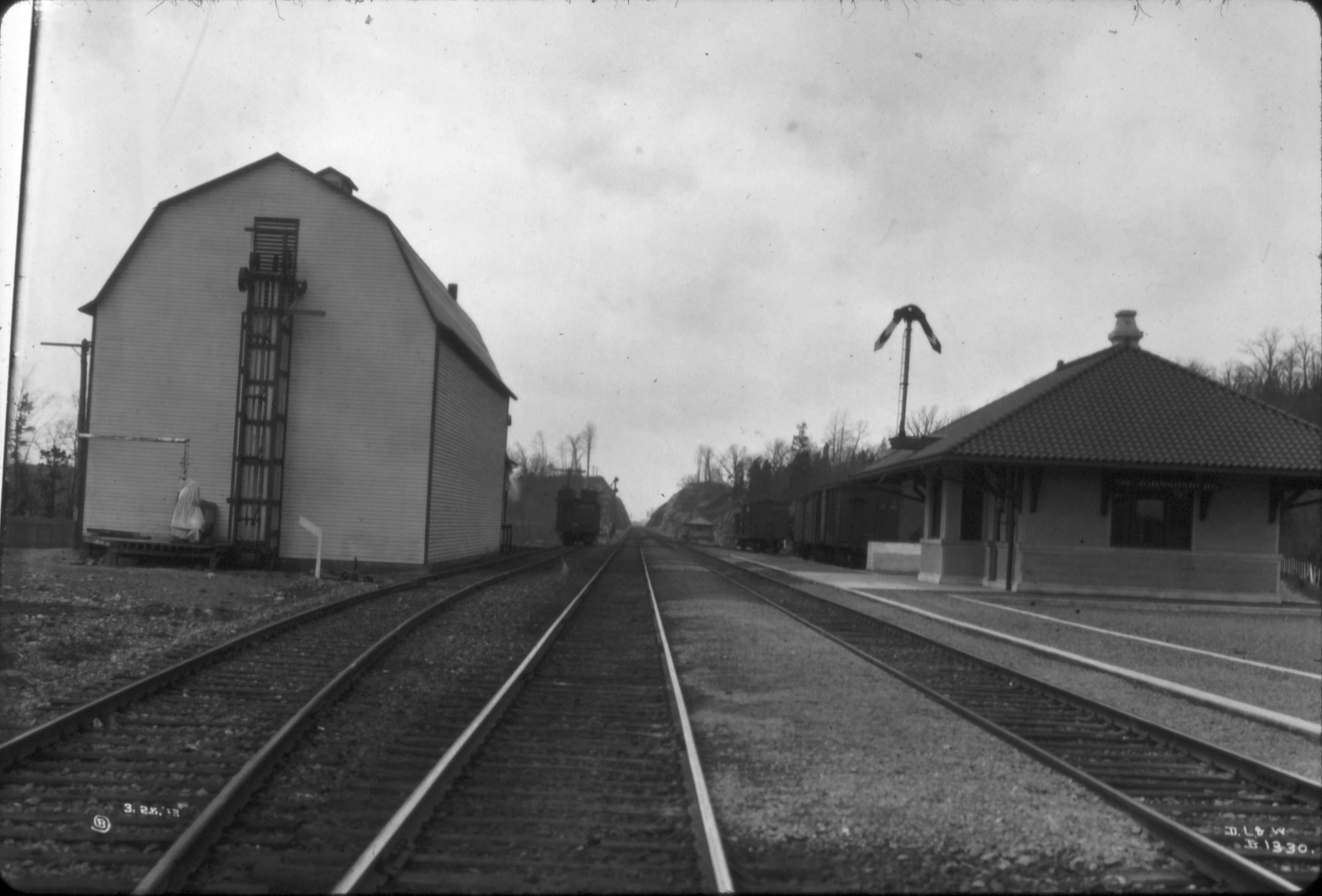
Near the midway point of Ramsey Fill were Johnsonburg Station, right, and creamery, shown here in 1911. Much of the fill material came from Armstrong Cut, visible in the distance.

Section 5 was given to Hyde, McFarlan & Burke; it consisted of miles 60.8–65.8 from Johnsonburg station to 1 mile west of Blairstown station.

==== Ramsey Fill ====
Located between miles 60.4 and 60.9 in Frelinghuysen Township, this .53-mile (0.85 km) fill has an average height of 21 feet (6.5 m), and a maximum height of 80 feet (24.6 m). It was created with 805,481 cubic yards (615,834 m^{3}) of fill material.

Ramsey Fill is on a tangent (straight) section of track, permitting 80 mph (129 km/h).

It is named for Stewart W. Ramsey, who owned most of the land acquired to build it.

Johnsonburg Station was built of reinforced concrete about midway along the fill.

==== Armstrong Cut ====
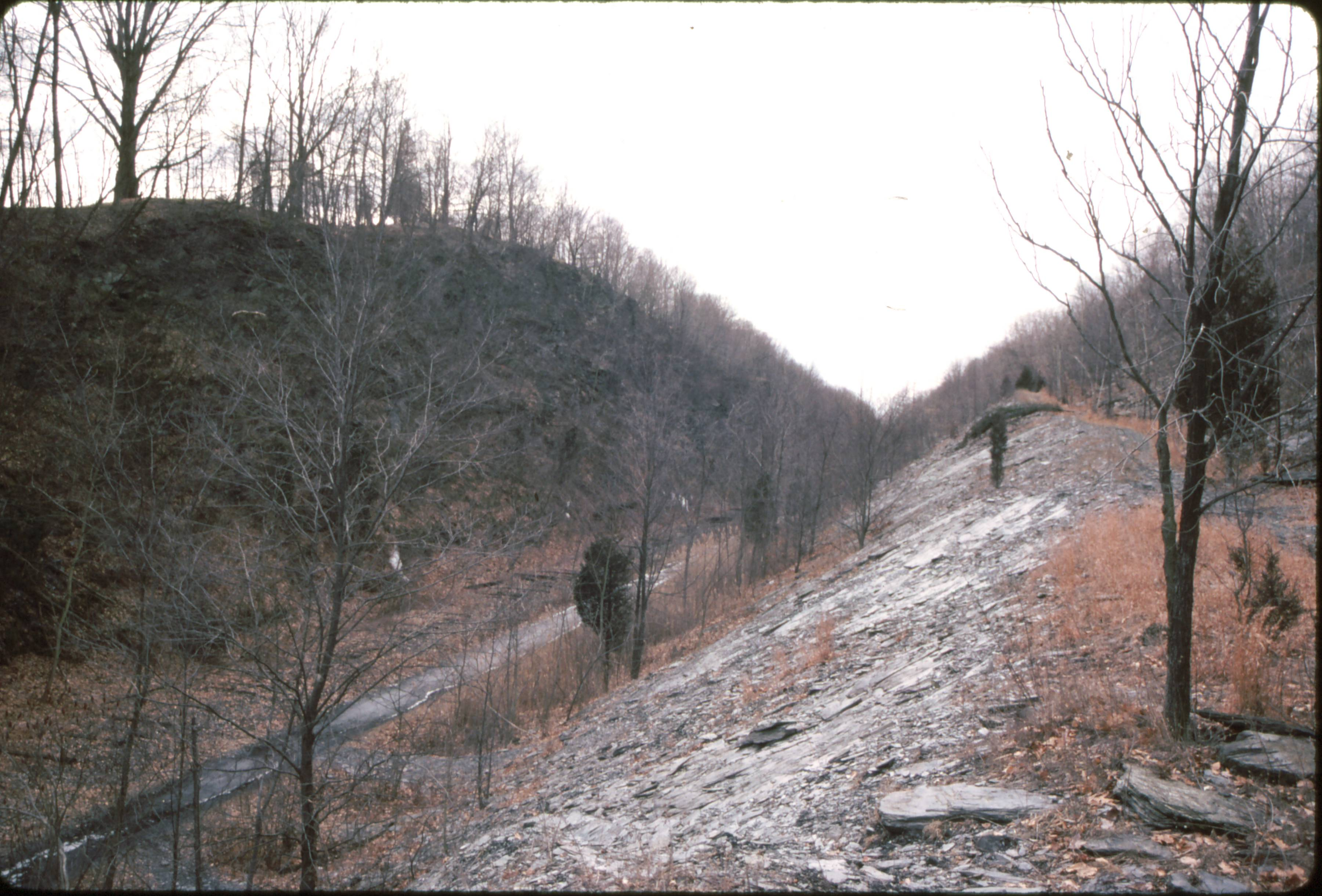
Westward view from atop the north side of Armstrong Cut in 1989. The tapered embankment in the foreground can also be seen in the above photo of Ramsey Fill.

One of the largest cuts on the Cut-Off, Armstrong Cut sits between mileposts 61.4 and 62.3 in Frelinghuysen Township. Created by removing 852,000 cubic yards of fill material, the cut is 0.89 miles (1.43 km) long, has an average depth of 52 feet (16 m), and a maximum depth of 104 feet (32 m). It accommodates a tangent (straight) section of track, permitting 80 mph (130 km/h).

Armstrong Cut is named for W.C. Armstrong, who had owned most of the land acquired for this cut.

Part of the north side of Armstrong Cut collapsed in 1941, completely blocking the Cut-Off, and causing all traffic to be diverted to the Lackawanna Old Road for a month while the embankment was excavated back. Legend has it that the collapse occurred in the middle of the night and that the freight agent at the freight station (the passenger station had closed the previous year) heard the embankment give way and raised the alarm.

==== Jones Cut ====
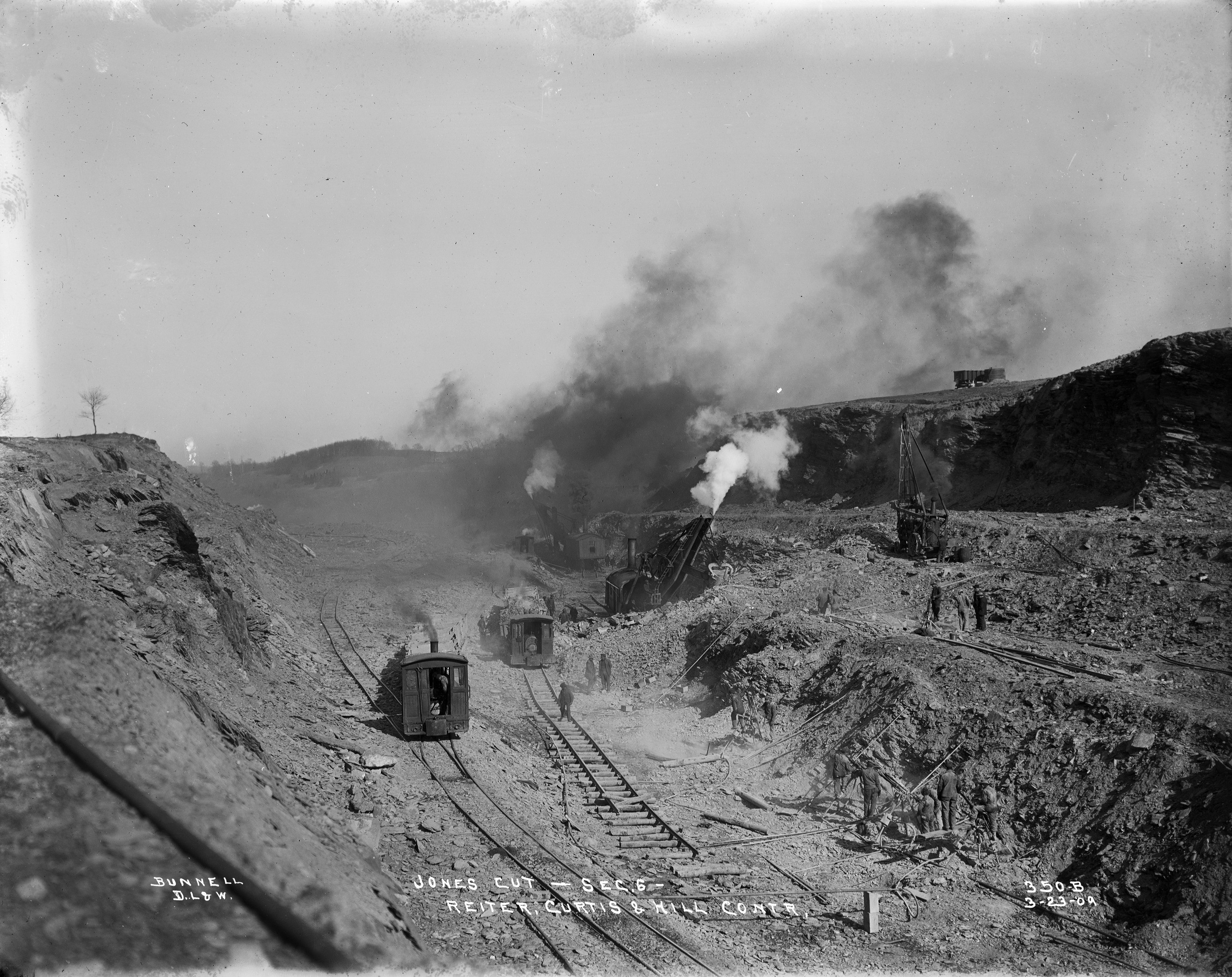
March 23, 1909, photo of early construction on Jones Cut.

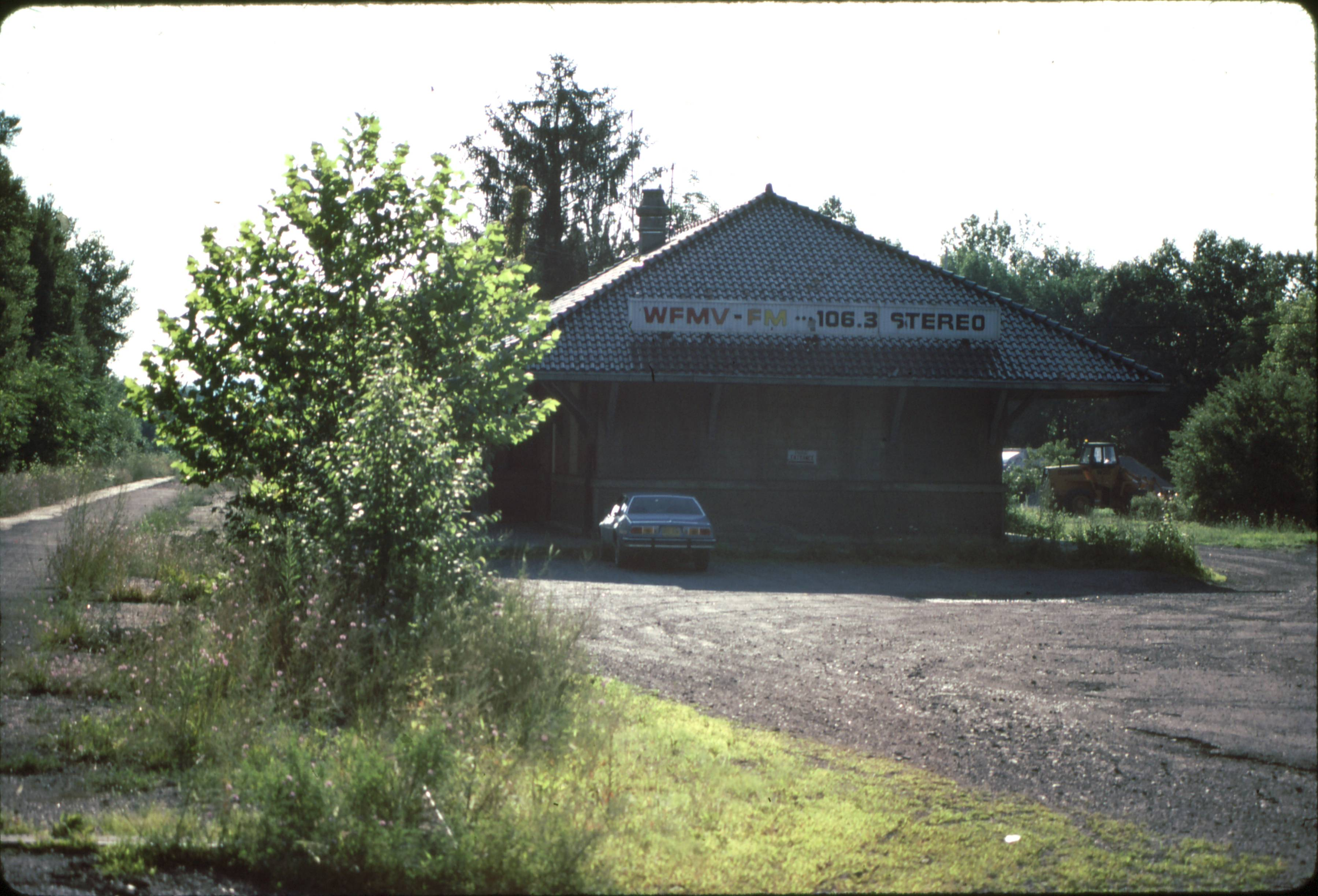
1988 photo of Blairstown Station at the western end of Jones Cut.

Located near milepost 64.8 in Blairstown Township, the cut was constructed by removing some 578,000 cubic yards (442,000 m^{3}) of fill material. Jones Cut is located on a tangent (straight) section of track, permitting speeds of 80 mph (129 km/h). Blairstown Station sits within the cut.

Jones Cut is named for William Jones, who was the principal owner of the land that was acquired for this cut.

Blairstown station and freight house were built of reinforced concrete at its western end.

==== Vail Fill ====
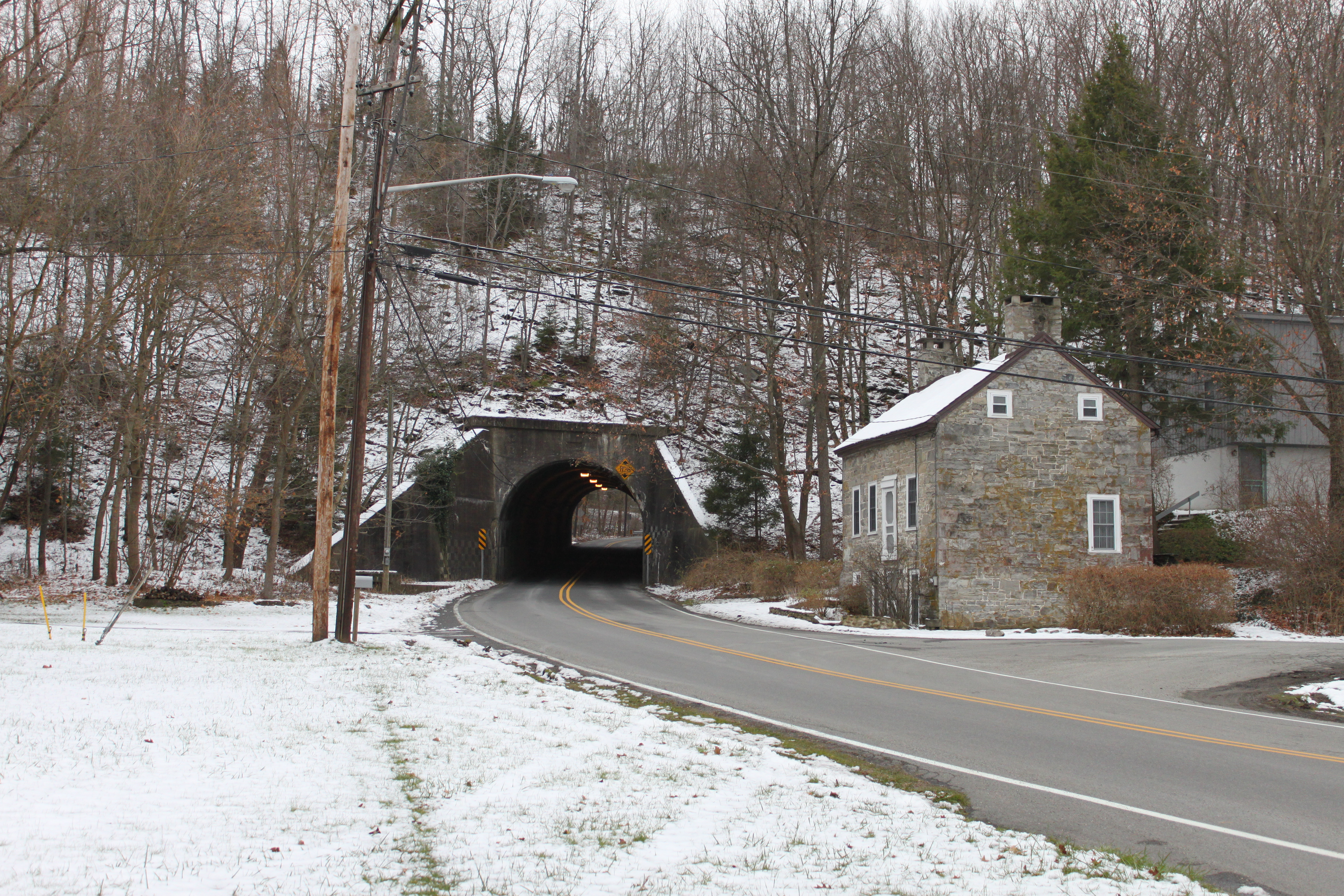
Vail Fill passes over Mt. Hermon Road in the Vail section of Blairstown, NJ.

Located between mileposts 65 and 65.3 in Blairstown Township, the fill was made of 293,500 cubic yards of material, much of which was obtained from nearby Jones Cut. The fill is 0.32 miles (0.51 km) long, an average of 39 feet (12 m) high, and a maximum of 102 feet (31 m) tall. Vail Fill is located on a 1° curved section of track, permitting 80 mph (130 km/h).

Vail Fill passes over Mt. Hermon Road, a location called Molasses Junction. In this location, which is the tallest part of this embankment, a stream was rechanneled under the road, which itself was realigned with the construction of the Cut-Off. This was done in several locations along the Cut-Off where a road and a stream crossed the right-of-way at about the same location. The underpass design is similar to others on the Cut-Off, which was controversial at the time of construction because some of the underpasses were narrow with a low clearance, and because in winter time horse-drawn sleighs would have a considerable "dead pull" (especially if upgrade) through the tunnel.

Vail Fill is named for the nearby hamlet of Vail.

=== Section 6 ===
This section, assigned to contractor Reiter, Curtis & Hill, included miles 65.8–70.8 from 1 mile west of Blairstown station to the west end of Paulinskill Viaduct.

==== Paulinskill Viaduct ====
This bridge over Paulinskill and the New York, Susquehanna & Western Railroad was the world's largest reinforced concrete structure at its completion.

=== Section 7 ===
Built by Smith, McCormick Co., Section 7 included miles 70.8–74.3, from the west end of Paulinskill Viaduct to Slateford Junction.

==== Delaware River Viaduct ====
This reinforced concrete bridge was originally planned as a curved structure. Smith, McCormick sub-contracted the grading of Section 7 to James A. Hart Co. of New York.

==== Slateford Junction ====
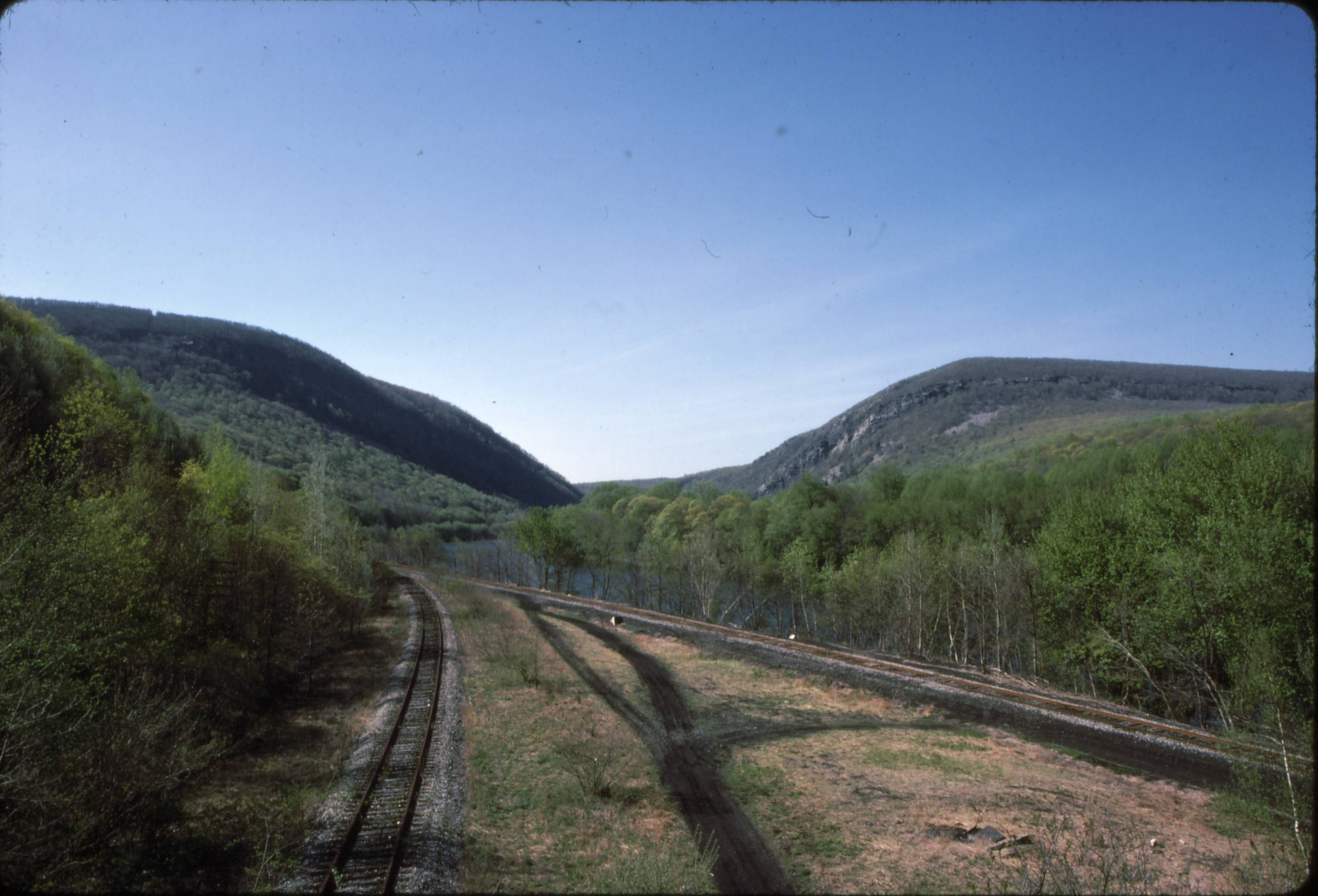
At Slateford Junction, looking north, the Lackawanna Cut-Off (left) and the Old Road (right) converge about 1,500 feet (460 m) past Slateford Tower (obscured by trees, left).

This railway junction in the small town of Slateford, Pennsylvania, was where the Cut-Off rejoined the original Lackawanna mainline, sat 28.5 miles (46 km) west of Port Morris Junction. When operations began on December 24, 1911, the junction merged four tracks (two main tracks and two sidings) from the Cut-Off with two from the Old Road.

An interlocking tower at the junction opened four days before the Cut-Off itself. The junction also included a 60-foot turntable, but this saw limited use; it was dismantled in the 1930s and its pit filled in shortly thereafter.
