= Blairstown station =

Railway station in Blairstown, New Jersey

Blairstown
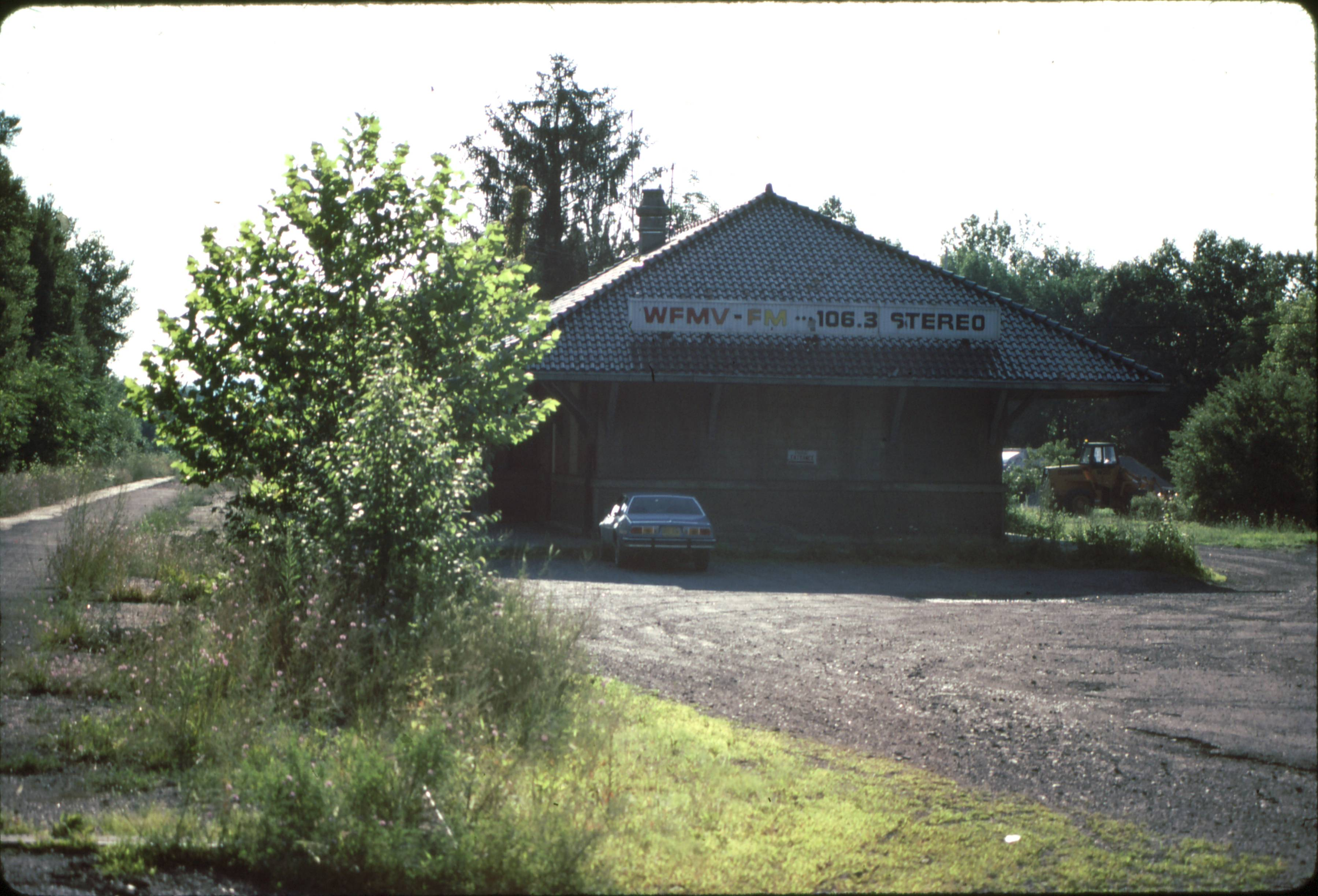
- The station house, now privately owned

General information
- Location: 48 Hope Road (CR 521), Blairstown Township, New Jersey
- Coordinates: 40.968200°N 74.953783°W
- Owner: Private ownership
- Line: Lackawanna Cut-Off

Construction
- Parking: 243 spaces (proposed)

Other information
- Station code: 65 (D&LW)

History
- Opened: December 24, 1911
- Closed: January 4, 1970

Former and proposed services
Preceding station	Delaware, Lackawanna and Western Railroad	Following station
Delaware Water Gap toward Buffalo	Main Line	Johnsonburg toward Hoboken
Proposed services
Preceding station	NJ Transit	Following station
Delaware Water Gap toward Scranton	Lackawanna Cut-Off	Andover toward New York or Hoboken
Location

Blairstown was one of the three original Delaware, Lackawanna and Western Railroad stations on the Lackawanna Cut-Off rail line in northwestern New Jersey. Built by contractor Hyde, McFarlan & Burke, the station opened in 1911. Most passenger trains, such as the Lackawanna Limited and, later, the Phoebe Snow, plus the Twilight/Pocono Express and the Westerner/New Yorker stopped at Blairstown, which also sold commuter tickets.

Blairstown station was the only station on the Cut-Off to be open during the Erie Lackawanna Railway years, and remained so until passenger service ended on January 6, 1970 with the discontinuing of the Lake Cities. After 1970, the building housed a radio station, WHCY-FM, until the 1990s. The station building is currently privately owned.

Blairstown is slated to become a station stop once again if a proposal by New Jersey Transit to restore rail service to Scranton, Pennsylvania, comes to fruition, with the station proposed to be situated between the track and Hope Road. In spring 2021, Amtrak announced plans for potential New York–Scranton route. Blairstown was cited as the intermediate station between Dover and East Stroudsburg on the route.

The Lackawanna Cut-Off Restoration Project reconnection to Blairstown appeared a step closer on April 13, 2022, when the NJ Transit board announced the approval of an approximated $32.5 million contract for completion of repairs to the Roseville Tunnel and construction of the new Andover station (14 miles east of Blairstown). It is anticipated that work will be completed in the latter part of 2026. Additional work remains for reinstalling track from Andover to Blairstown.
