= County of Lackawanna Transit System =

Transport operator in Pennsylvania, United States

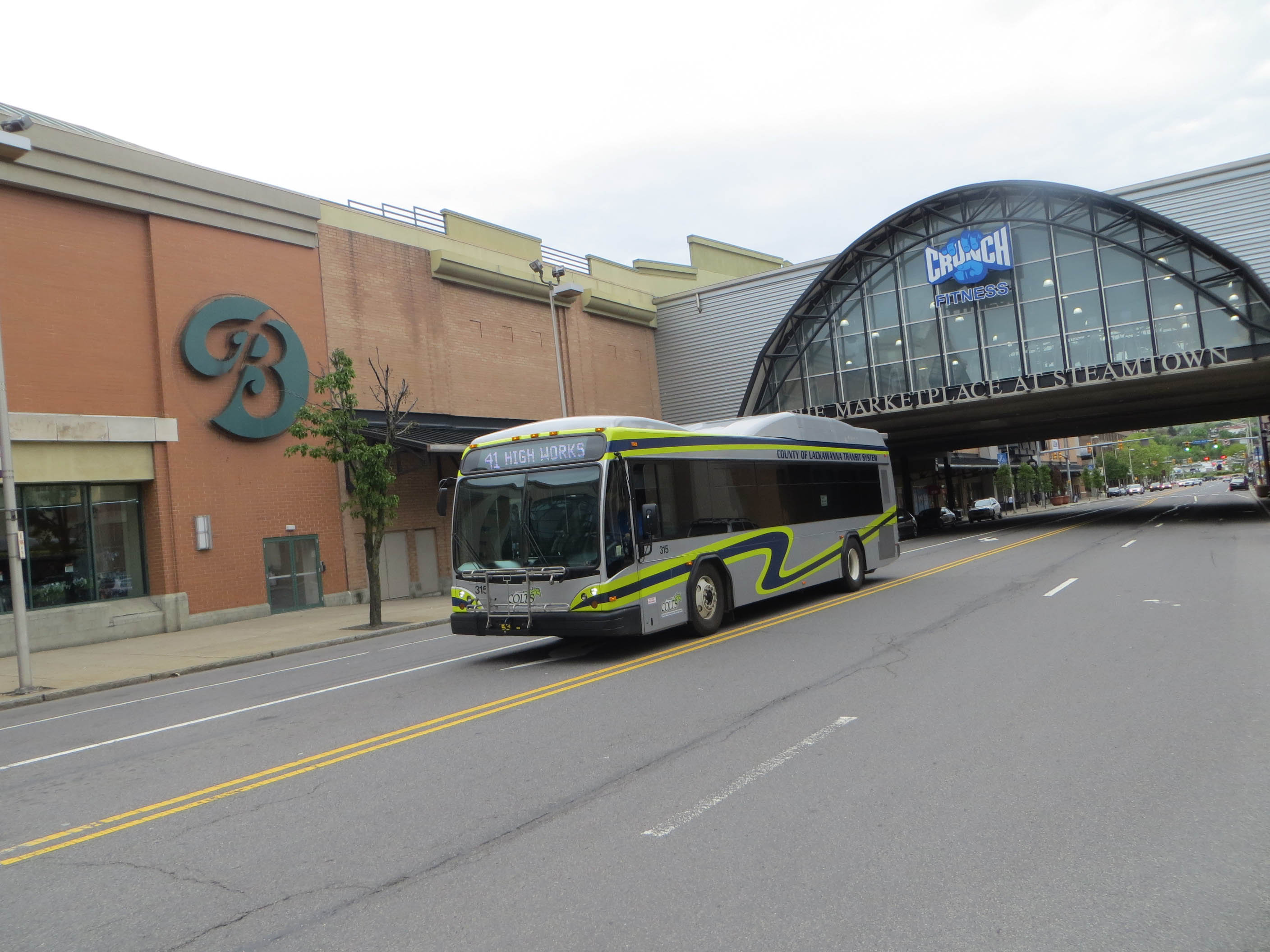
- COLTS bus 315 operating on Route 41 on Lackawanna Av in Scranton
- Headquarters: Scranton, Pennsylvania
- Service area: Scranton, Pennsylvania Area
- Service type: Bus, paratransit
- Routes: 30
- Hubs: Lackawanna Transit Center (Downtown Scranton)
- Daily ridership: 2,800 (weekdays, Q1 2026)
- Annual ridership: 885,100 (2025)
- Fuel type: CNG
- Website: coltsbus.com

The County of Lackawanna Transit System (COLTS) is the operator of public transport for the city of Scranton urban area and its surrounding area of Lackawanna County, Pennsylvania. It began operations in 1972, largely using routes established by predecessor Scranton Transit. In 2025, the system had a ridership of 885,100, or about 2,800 per weekday as of the first quarter of 2026.

== Routes ==
The COLTS system operates 36 distinct routes. Each route may operate at different times, other than weekdays. Most routes depart from the Lackawanna Transit Center on Lackawanna Avenue, near the Mall at Steamtown, in Downtown Scranton.

- 12 Jessup
- 13 Drinker/Marywood (Saturdays)
- 14 Drinker
- 18 Petersburg
- 21 East Mountain
- 25 Valley View
- 26 Hilltop
- 28 Pittston
- 29 Stauffer Industrial Park via South Main
- 31 Old Forge
- 34 Keyser Valley (Saturday)
- 35 Keyser Valley (Weekday)
- 36 Lafayette (Weekday)
- 37 Lafayette/Oram (Saturday)
- 38 Oram (Weekday)
- 41 High Works
- 43 Viewmont/Bangor
- 45 Viewmont Mall Express
- 46 Mall Circulator
- 48 Dalton/Waverly/Clarks Summit (Weekday)
- 49 Dalton/Waverly/Clarks Summit (Saturday)
- 50 Shoppers Special
- 52 Carbondale
- 53 Marywood/University of Scranton
- 54 Greenridge/Dickson City
- 71 Evening City Circle North
- 72 Evening City Circle South
- 73 Saturday Night Special (seasonal)
- 82 Simpson/Carbondale/Route 6
- 83 Newton/Ransom
- 84 Chinchilla/Clarks Green/Justus
- 96 First Friday Circulator
- 101 The Bergamino Express

== Fleet ==
COLTS operates a mix of Gillig branded buses in the Phantom, Advantage and BRT models, in 30 and 35 foot lengths. In addition, some smaller, cutaway style vans perform service on lower patronized routes. COLTS operates a fleet of 35 buses.

=== Current fleet ===
- 2011: 9 35 ft. Gillig BRT hybrid electric buses powered by Cummins ISL9 (309-317)
- 2015: 5 35 ft. Gillig BRTs powered by Cummins ISL9 (318-322)
- 2018: 10 35 ft. Gillig BRT CNG buses powered by Cummins Westport L9N (323-332)
- 2019: 3 35 ft. Gillig BRT CNG buses powered by Cummins Westport L9N (333-335)
- 2023: 4 35 ft. Gillig Low Floor CNG buses powered by Cummins Westport L9N (336-339)
- 2024: 4 35 ft. Gillig Low Floor CNG buses powered by Cummins Westport L9N (340-343)

== Connections to other agencies ==
COLTS bus service connects to conventional Luzerne County Transportation Authority (LCTA) bus service at West Pittston, Old Forge, and Mohegan Sun Casino. In addition, less frequent with LCTA meet up with COLTS buses at the Wyoming Street transfer center near the Mall at Steamtown weekdays and Saturdays.

On Lackawanna Avenue, at the Lackawanna Transit Center, COLTS service connects with Greyhound Lines, Martz Trailways, New York Trailways, and Fullington Trailways.

== Criticism ==
=== Ban on religious-based content ===
In 2013, after NEPA Freethought Society spent 18 months attempting to advertise their group, which used the word "Atheists", COLTS denied his request, calling it, "Too controversial". After trying again with a similar advertisement, COLTS responded by revising their advertising policy to reject all forms of religion-based advertisements. As COLTS had previously allowed several churches, a political candidate, and a blog that focused on anti-Semitism, holocaust denial, and white supremacy to all run advertisements in the past, COLTS was subsequently sued, in order to remove the ban.

== See also ==
- Luzerne County Transportation Authority
