= Johnsonburg station =

Railway station in New Jersey, United States

JOHNSONBURG
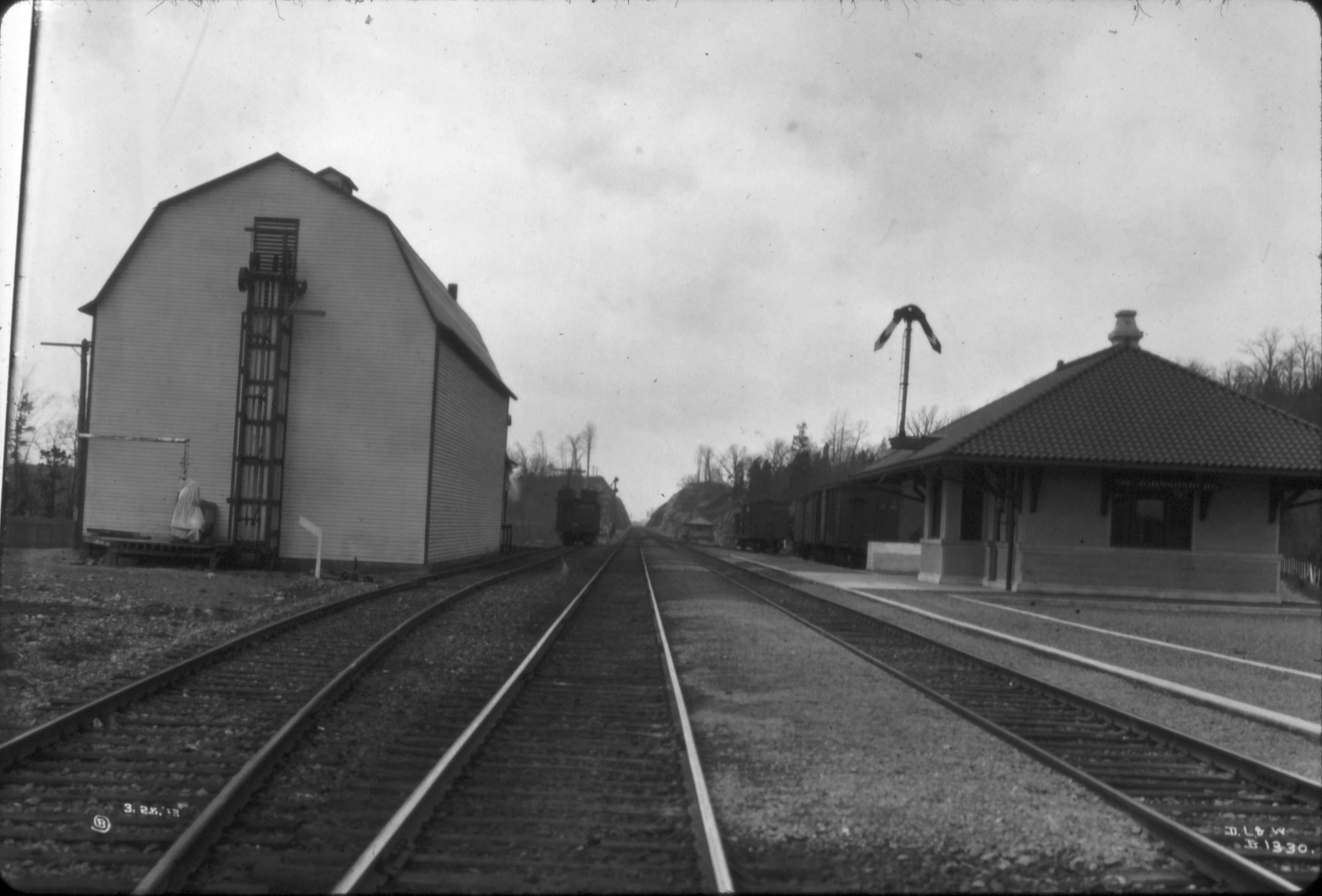
- Johnsonburg station (right) and creamery in 1911. In the distant background is Armstrong Cut, where a 1941 landslide closed the Cut-Off for a month and led to the trimming of the cut's north (right) side

General information
- Location: Kerrs Corners Road, Frelinghuysen Township, New Jersey
- Coordinates: 40.970440°N 74.877417°W
- Owner: State of New Jersey
- Tracks: 2

Other information
- Station code: 61

History
- Opened: December 24, 1911
- Closed: 1941; September 28, 1952 (as flag stop)

Services
Preceding station	Delaware, Lackawanna and Western Railroad	Following station
Blairstown toward Buffalo	Main Line	Greendell toward Hoboken
Location

Johnsonburg was a railroad station and was one of the three original stations on the Lackawanna Cut-Off in northwestern New Jersey. Built by contractor Hyde, McFarlan & Burke, the station opened in 1911. Located on the western end of Ramsey Fill in rural Frelinghuysen Township, the station generated only modest passenger and freight business for the railroad. As a result, it was closed in 1940. The station was temporarily reopened in 1941 to serve as a command post for the clearing of the landslide that took place within nearby Armstrong Cut. After the closing of the station building, Johnsonburg continued to be a flag stop on the Cut-Off until the 1960s. A creamery was built by the railroad at the station site and operated for a number of years.

In the early 1990s, the station building was rehabilitated by Jerry Turco, who owned the Cut-Off from 1985–2001, after the line had been abandoned by Conrail. But the isolated building was subject to vandalism, and in 2007, Johnsonburg station was demolished by the state of New Jersey.
