= Waltz & Reece Construction Company =

The Waltz & Reece Construction Company was a construction company that operated in the first quarter of the 20th century, best known for its work on the Lackawanna Cut-off in New Jersey.

The original partners were P.L. Reece and J.B. Waltz. In 1899, they put a lien on the Yellowstone Park railway company to recover $5,293.47 owed to them for work on the railroad.

The partners incorporated the company in Billings, Montana, on May 28, 1902.

Between 1908 and 1911, the company built the section of the Lackawanna Cut-off that ran from mileposts 48.2 to 50.2, working occasionally by torchlight to keep the massive project on schedule. Dubbed Section 2, the stretch included the Waltz & Reece Cut, the deepest cut on the 28.5-mile (45.9 km) project. The cut required the removal of 822,400 cubic yards of fill material by blasting with dynamite and other methods.

In 1912, the company moved its headquarters from Stanhope and Netcong, New Jersey, to Nicholson, Pennsylvania. Reece and Waltz, both engineers, worked on piers 5 and 6 of the Tunkhannock Viaduct, the largest concrete structure in the world when completed in 1915.

In 1917, the company purchased the year-old Lackawanna Cutlery Company of Nicholson. The officers at the time were Reece, president, of Billings; Waltz, vice president, of Nicholson; G.M. Sipley, secretary and treasurer, of Lewisburg, Pennsylvania; and R.H. Linton, general superintendent, of Nicholson.

Waltz died in 1919, Reece in 1930. Both are buried in the Nicholson Cemetery.
