= David W. Flickwir =

American civil engineer and railroad executive

David Williamson Flickwir (1852-1935) was a civil engineer and railroad engineering contractor. His company built one of the world's largest concrete bridges, the Tunkhannock Viaduct.

== Early life and career ==
David W. Flickwir was born in Philadelphia, Pennsylvania, on September 26, 1852, to Joseph Williamson Flickwir (1809-1899) and Rebecca Barton (1824-1907). He entered railroad work in 1871 as a rodman in an engineering corps for a railroad. In 1875, Flickwir was an engineer for the construction of the buildings for the Centennial Exposition in Philadelphia. An 1876 Philadelphia business directory lists Flickwir as a consulting civil engineer.

In 1893, Flickwir married Charlotte Nalle (1856-1923) of Orange County, Virginia. Nalle died in October 1923. Flickwir remarried in May 1925 to Mildred A. Elder (1892-1991) who was the nursing superintendent at Roanoke Hospital (today Carilion Roanoke Memorial Hospital).

== Railroad engineer and contractor ==
In 1879, he was a construction engineer on the Shenandoah Valley Railroad. In 1881, he moved to Roanoke, Virginia. In 1883, he was made engineer and superintendent of the SVR. In 1890, he was appointed general superintendent of the Eastern General Division of the Norfolk and Western Railroad, and served in that capacity until he resigned on February 1, 1895. In 1896, he started his own contracting firm, the Flickwir company.

In 1908, Flickwir's company received a contract from the Delaware, Lackawanna and Western Railroad (DL&W) to build Section 3 of the Lackawanna Cut-off, a rail line that would run from northwestern New Jersey to northeastern Pennsylvania. The Flickwir company would build the line from mileposts 50.2 to 55.8, as measured from the DL&W's Hoboken Terminal, a stretch that required the construction of Wharton Fill, Roseville Tunnel, Colby Cut, and the eastern half of the mammoth Pequest Fill. During this project, Flickwir worked with Lincoln Bush, the Lackawanna's chief engineer. After the work wrapped up in late 1911, Bush left the railroad and joined Flickwir in a business partnership, Flickwir & Bush.

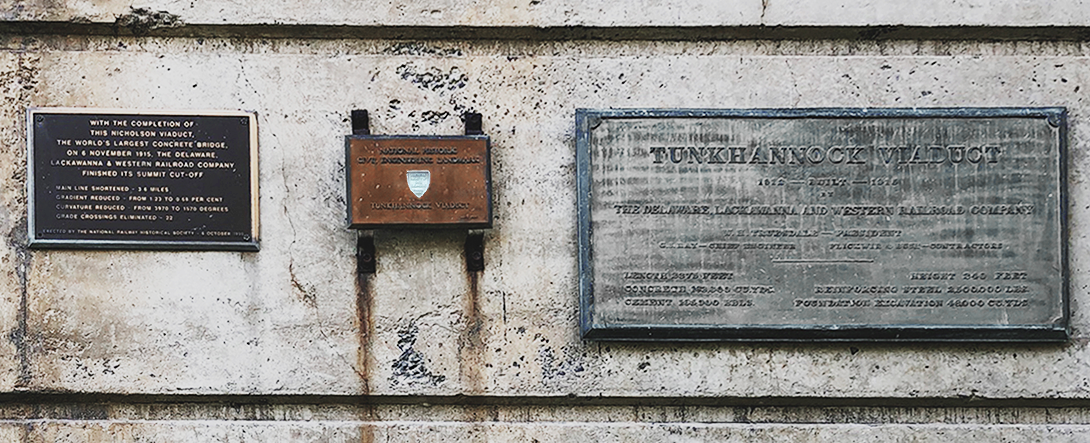
Tunkhannock Bridge plaque on the right with reference to Flickwir and Bush as contractor

From 1912 to 1915, Flickwir & Bush built the DL&W's Tunkhannock Viaduct, a concrete deck arch bridge that spans the Tunkhannock Creek in Nicholson, Pennsylvania, in the United States, as part of the Nicholson Cutoff project. Measuring 2,375 feet (724 m) long and towering 240 feet (73 m) when measured from the creek bed (300 feet (91 m) from bedrock), it was the largest concrete structure in the world when completed in 1915 and still merited "the title of largest concrete bridge in America, if not the world" 50 years later.

In 1916, Flickwir was elected a director of the Norfolk and Western Railroad company succeeding Walter H. Taylor (1838-1916).

== Banker ==
In 1926, Flickwir joined the First National Exchange Bank of Roanoke.

== Death and legacy ==
By 1906, Flickwir was wealthy enough to commission a grand house in the Colonial Revival style. The house helped set architectural trends in the city: "The great history books on Roanoke all pay homage to this structure," said Kent Chrisman of the Roanoke Historical Society. In 2005, Jefferson College of Health Sciences renovated the house for use as its admissions and financial aid office and renamed it "Fralin House". Over the 1920s and 1930s, he gave hundreds of thousands of dollars to the hospital, which dubbed him its "Greatest Benefactor". A 1925 building he funded, the Flickwir Memorial Unit, still stands.

Flickwir died in 1935 after a short illness at age 83.

== Gallery ==
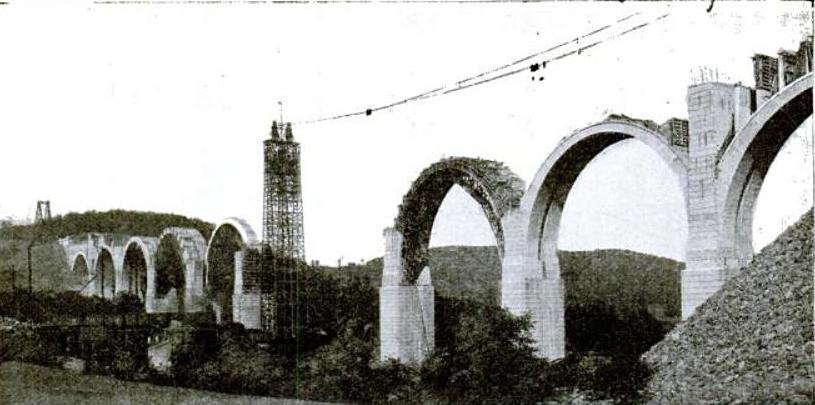
Tunkhannock Viaduct under construction in 1914

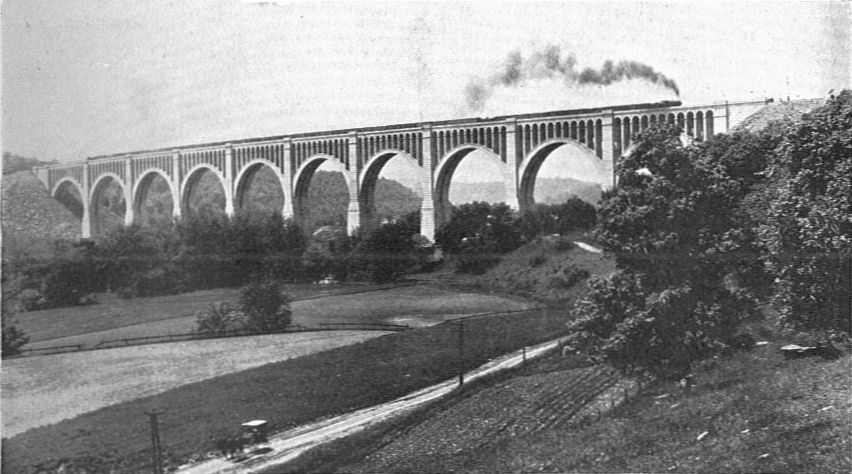
Tunkhannock viaduct, 1928

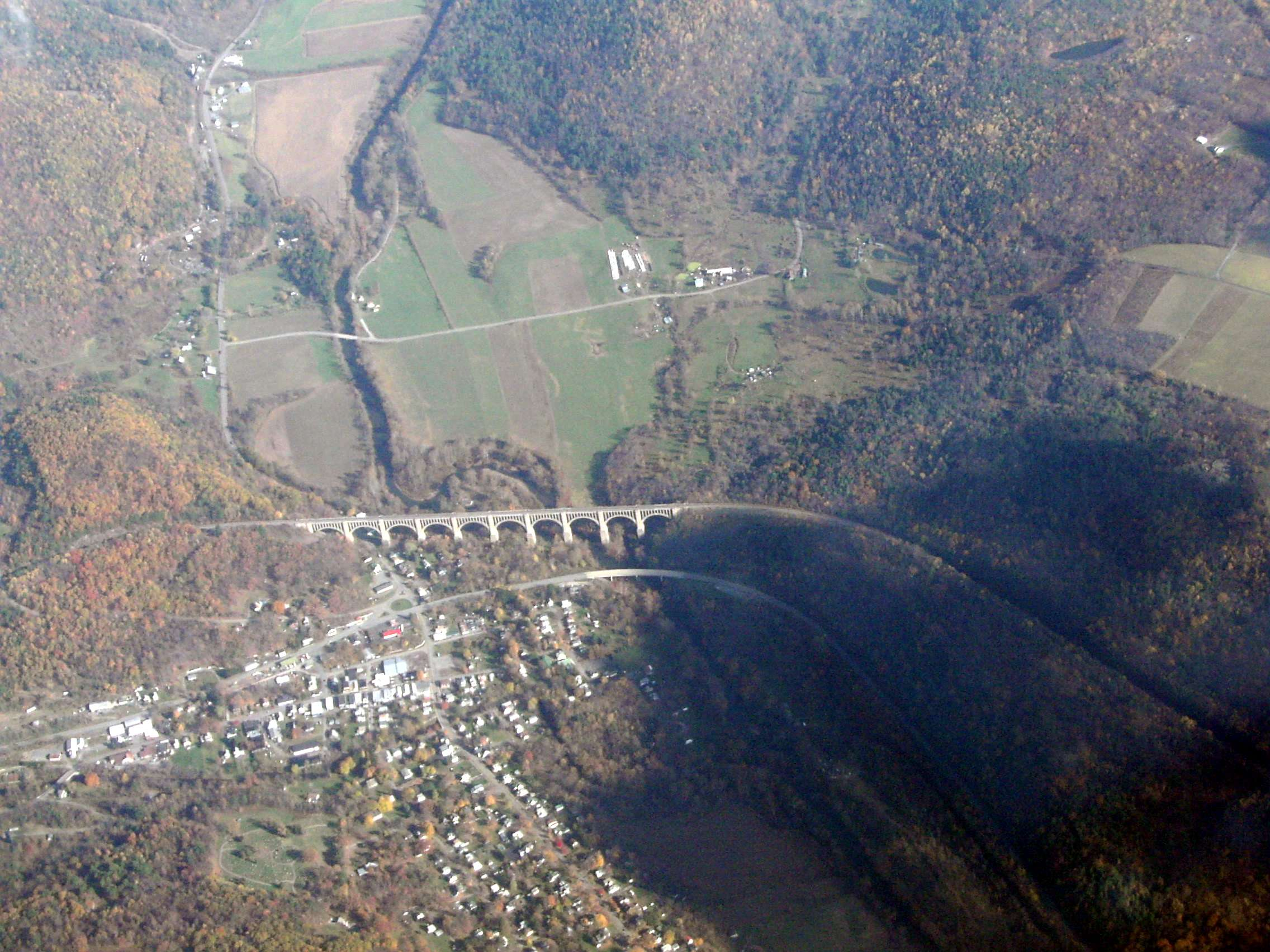
Tunkhannock Viaduct from a commercial airline flight from Ottawa to Philadelphia

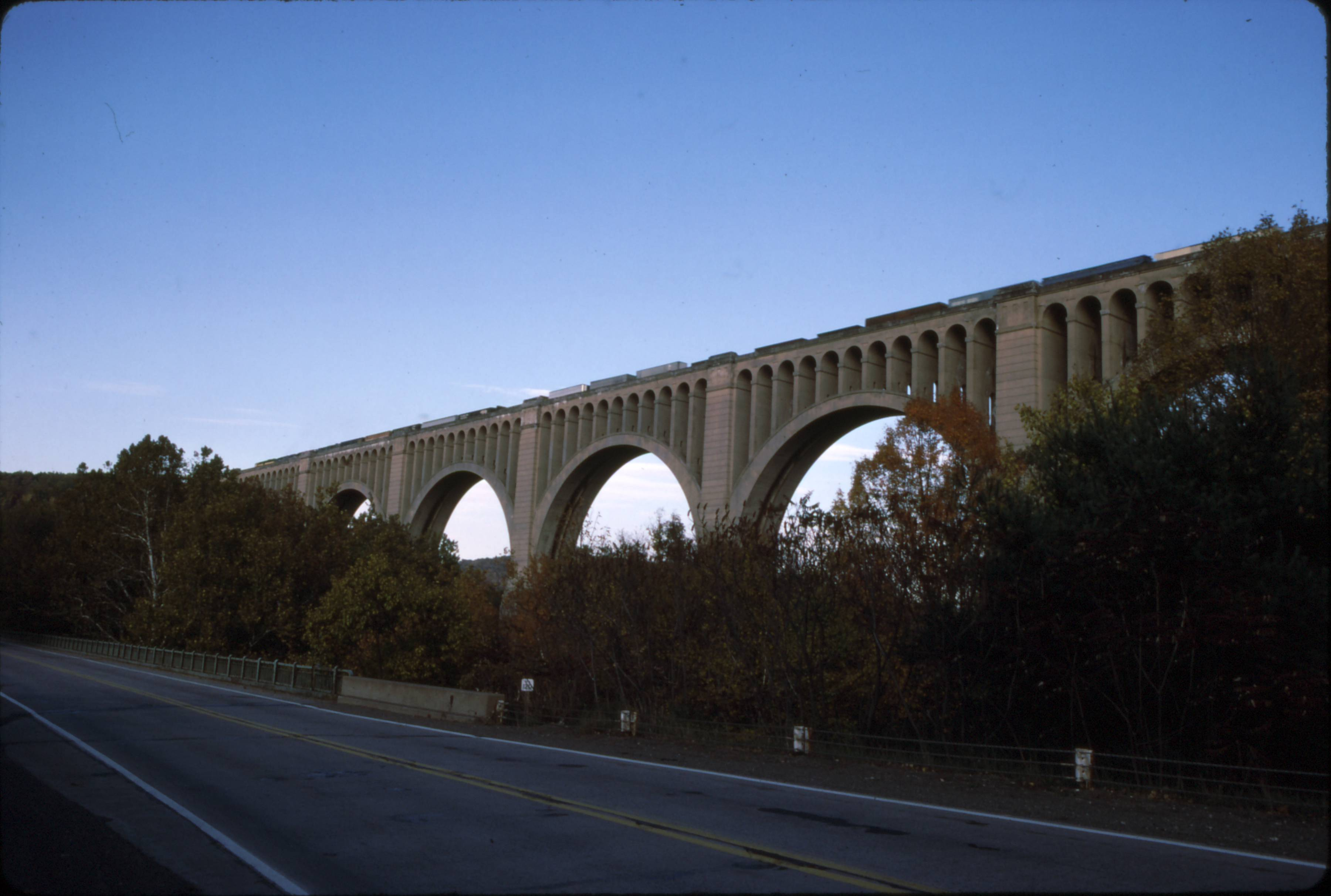
Tunkhannock Viaduct, as seen from Route 11

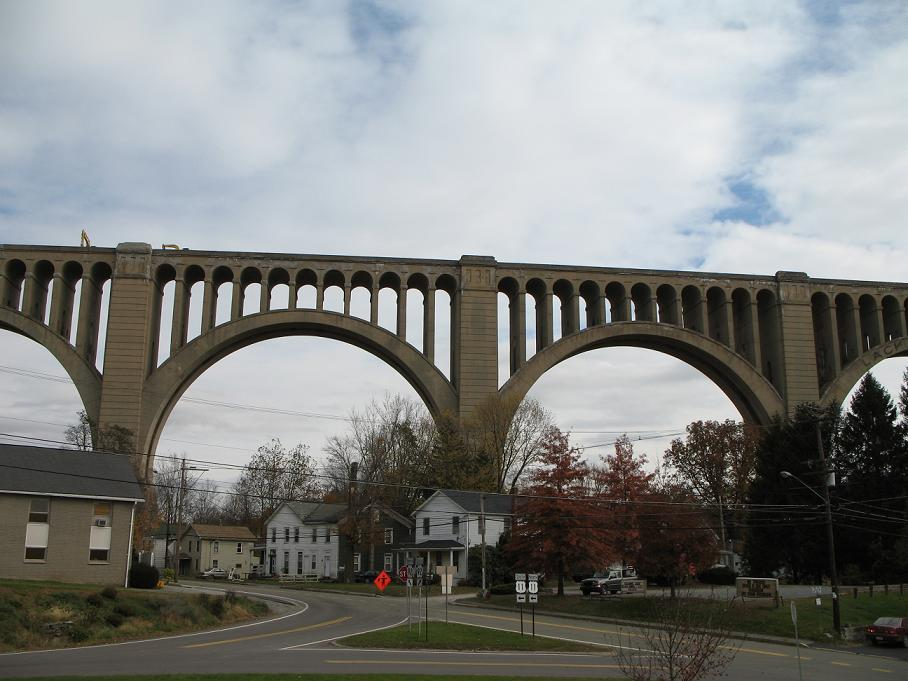
Viaduct over Nicholson, PA
