= Lincoln Bush =

American railroad engineer (1860–1940)

Lincoln Lincoln Bush (December 14, 1860 – December 10, 1940) was an American civil engineer and inventor, known for his work with railroads.

== Biography ==
Bush was born on December 14, 1860, in Palos Township, Illinois, the son of Lewis Bush and Mary Ritchey Bush. He was named for the newly elected president, although later dropped the name 'Abraham'. He was educated as a teacher at the Cook County Normal School, and taught for several years in public schools. Subsequently, he chose to become an engineer, and attended the University of Illinois. There he was a member and President of the Engineers' Club, and earned a Bachelor of Science degree in Civil Engineering in 1888. He then worked in a series of positions, as an assistant engineer at the Union Pacific Railroad and Pacific Shortline from 1888 to 1890, as assistant to Civil Engineer Elmer Lawrence Cathell from 1890 to 1892, as a Chief Draftsman in the West Office of the Pittsburg Bridge Company from 1892 to 1896, and Assistant Bridge Engineer and Acting Division Engineer for the Chicago and North Western Railroad from 1900 to 1903.

Bush began work for the Delaware, Lackawanna and Western Railroad (DL&W) in 1900, and in 1903 became that railroad's Chief Engineer. a position he served in for six years, during which he directed many improvements to the line and facilities, sometimes working with the company architect, Frank J. Nies. Bush designed the tracks and sheds for the Lackawanna's Hoboken Terminal, the head house of which was designed by architect Kenneth Murchison. In place of the wide-span balloon roofs used at major terminals up to that time, Bush developed and patented a modular style of train shed known as Bush-style sheds, constructed of cast iron, steel and concrete, incorporating a vent over the tracks to allow steam and smoke to escape and skylights over the passenger platforms for illumination. Bush sheds were cheaper and easier to construct than balloon roofs, and were adopted for use at several major terminals in the years immediately following. Bush led planning of the Lackawanna Cut-Off, a huge project to eliminate curves, hills, and grade crossings, although construction was completed after he left the railroad.

In 1909, Bush resigned from the DL&W to become a partner in the civil engineering consulting firm Flickwir and Bush. During his time as president, chief engineer and treasurer of the firm he oversaw construction of the massive Tunkhannock Viaduct, the largest concrete structure in the world at the time, for the Lackawanna. During World War I he served in the construction division of the Army Quartermaster Corps as a Colonel, and designed ports, warehouses, arsenals, and other structures. Following the war, he and the officers of the Roberts & Schaefer Company organized the new engineering firm of Bush, Roberts & Schaefer Company to specialize in concrete bridges and viaducts, elevated tracks, piers, and general engineering.

Bush served as President of the University of Illinois Alumni Association of New York, as Director of the American Society of Civil Engineers, and was a member of the Western Society of Engineers, the American Railway Engineering Association, and the American Institute of Consulting Engineers.

Lincoln Bush married Alma Rosetta Green of Colfax, Illinois, in 1890. They had two sons, Cedric Lincoln Bush, born in 1892, and Denzil Sidney Bush, born in 1901. They made their home in East Orange, New Jersey, where Bush was a member of the Arlington Avenue Presbyterian Church. He died at home on December 10, 1940.

== Works ==
- train sheds, Delaware, Lackawanna & Western Hoboken Terminal, Hoboken, New Jersey, 1906
- Delaware, Lackawanna & Western Railroad Station, Leicester, New York, 1908
- Paulinskill Viaduct, Knowlton Township, New Jersey, 1910
- train sheds, Union Station, Winnipeg, Manitoba, 1911
- planning the construction of the Lackawanna Cut-Off, 1911
- train sheds, Central Railroad of New Jersey Terminal, Jersey City, New Jersey, 1914
- Tunkhannock Viaduct, Nicholson, Pennsylvania, 1915, as a partner in Flickwir & Bush
- train sheds, Union Station, Toronto, Ontario, 1929-1930 based on Bush design by Toronto Terminals Railway Assistant Bridge Engineer A.R. Ketterson.
- train sheds, Pennsylvania Station, North Charles Street, Baltimore, Maryland

== Gallery ==
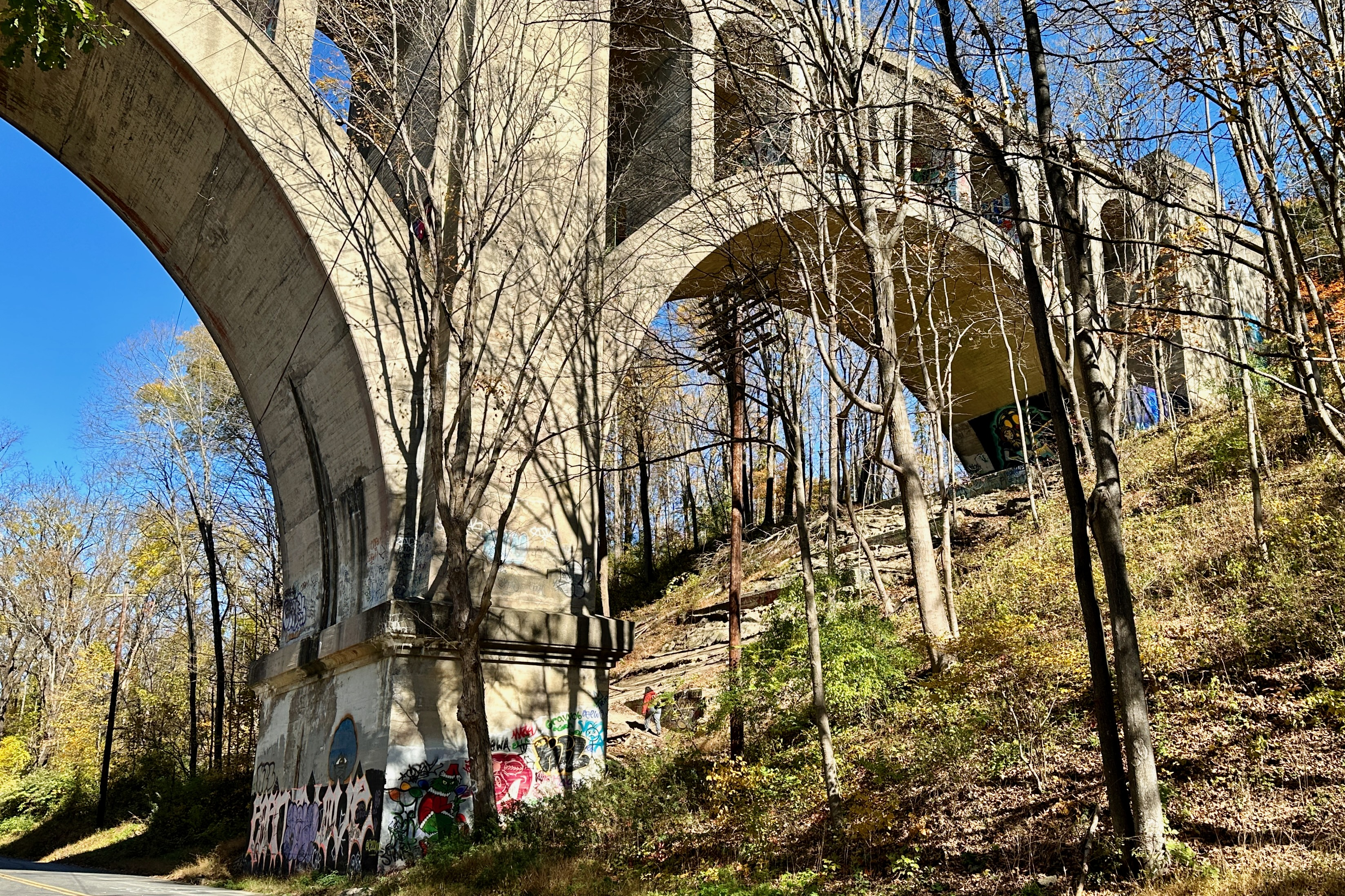
Paulinskill Viaduct at Hainesburg, NJ

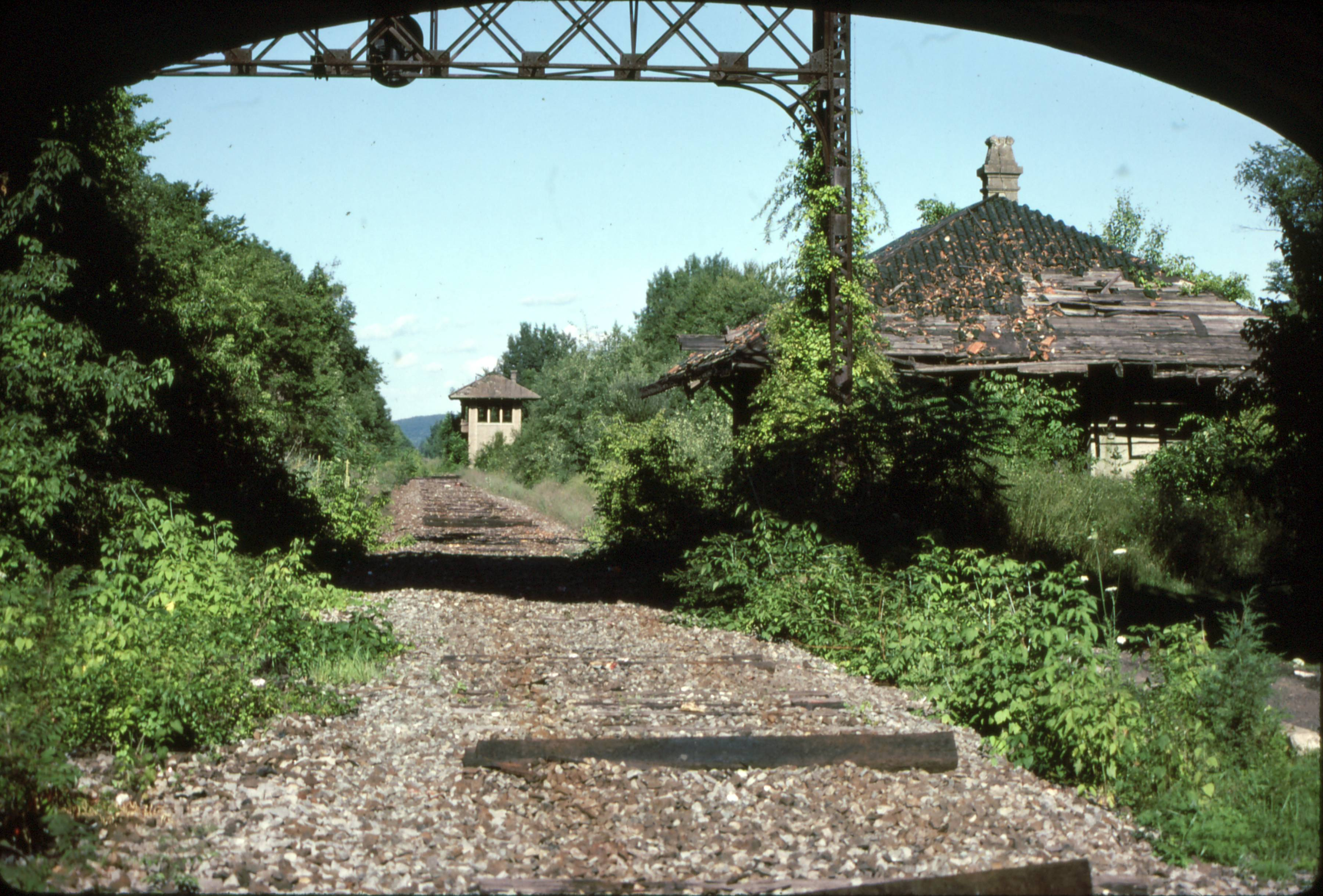
Abandoned section of the Lackawanna Cutoff at Greendell, NJ

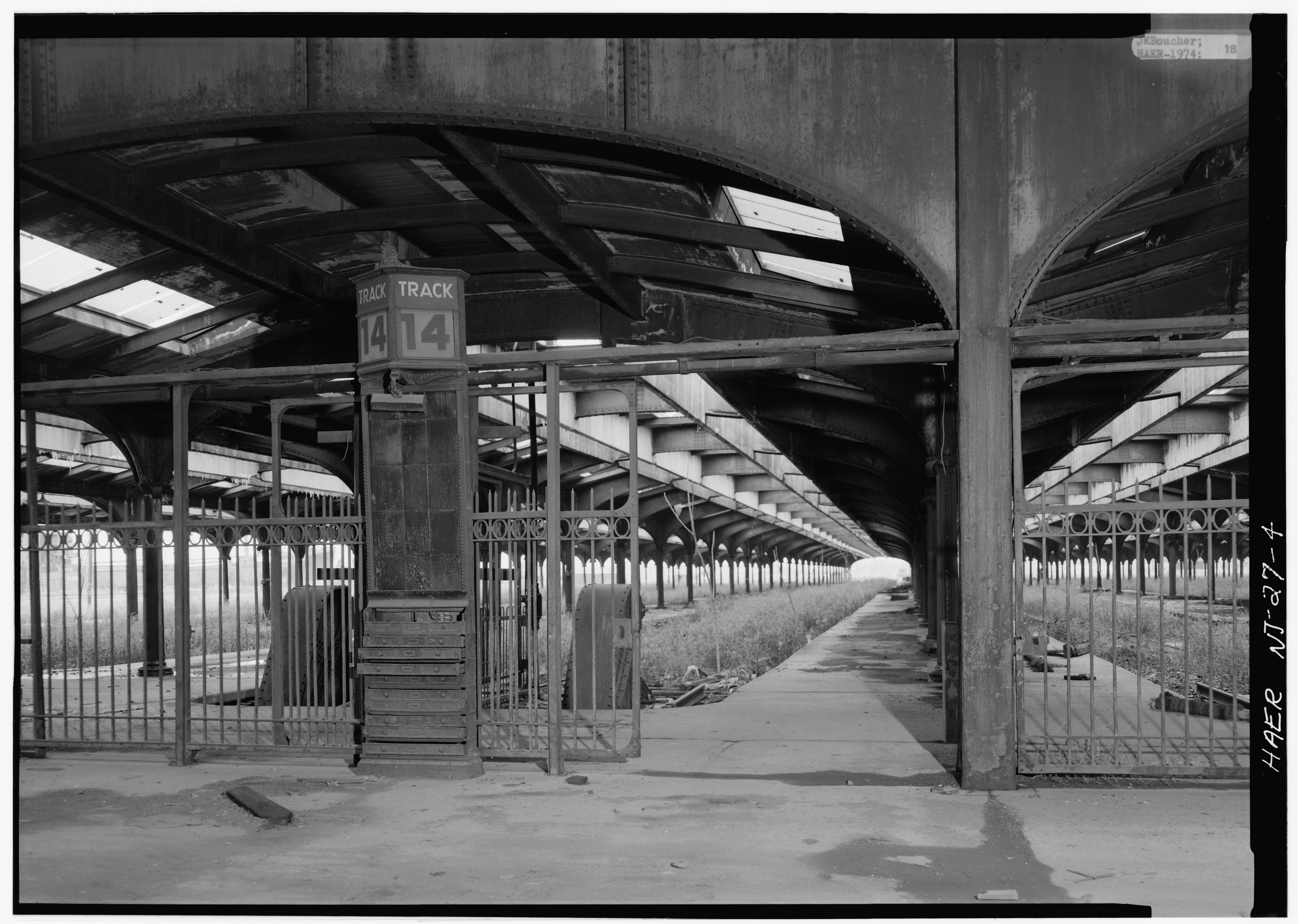
Bush train sheds, CNJ Terminal, Jersey City

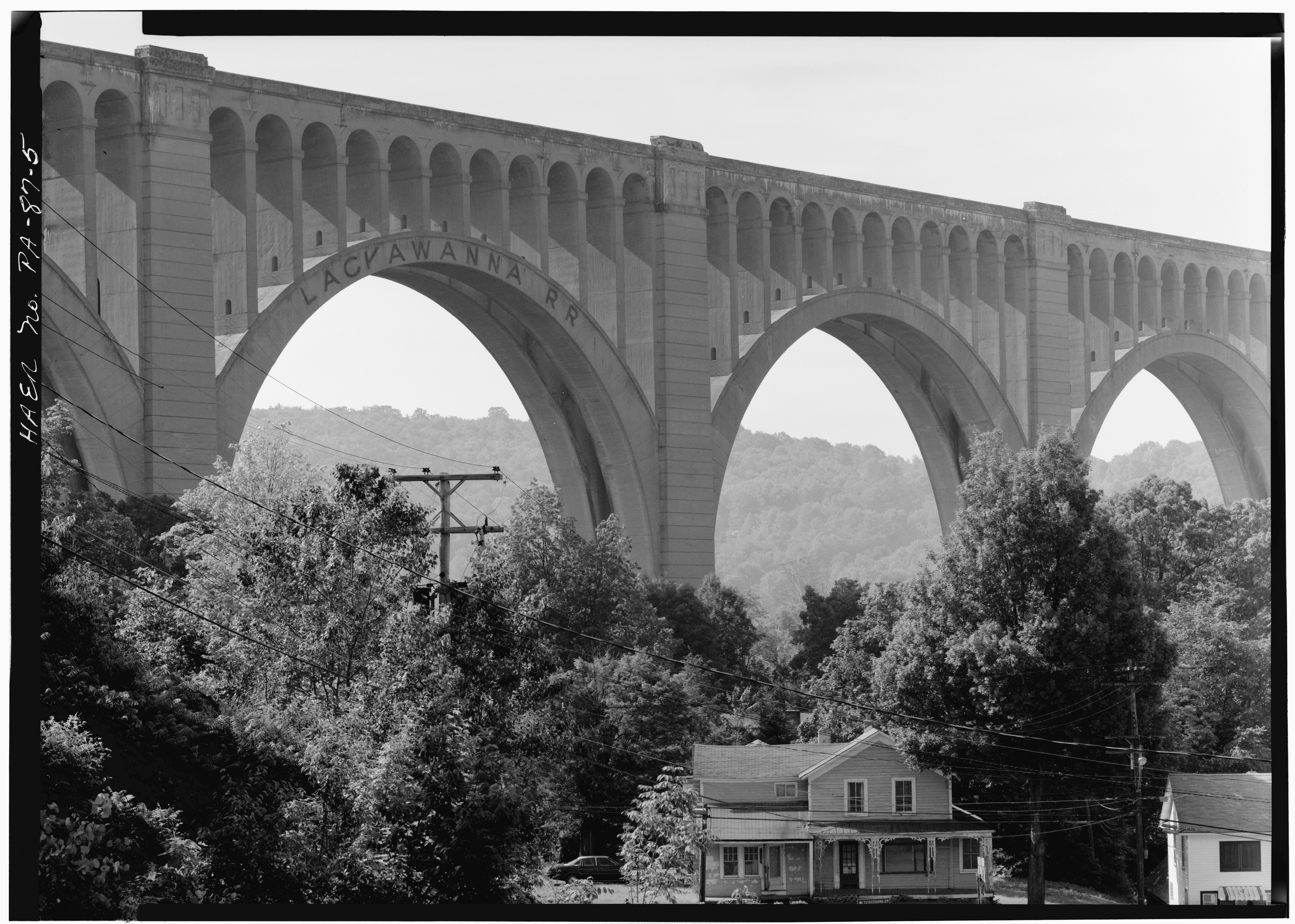
Tunkhannock Viaduct, Pennsylvania
