= Scranton Railway =

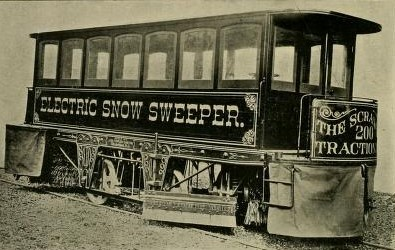
Electric snow sweeper of Scranton Traction Company, 1893

The Scranton Railway Company built and operated electric trolleys in and around Scranton, Pennsylvania, from 1896 until 1954.

The company was formed to consolidate various trolley companies in Scranton and Lackawanna County. At its peak, the company had city lines in Scranton and Dunmore and suburban lines north to Forest City and south to Duryea and Pittston. Its last trolley ran in 1954.

== History ==
The Scranton Railway was formed in 1896 with the consolidation of five of Scranton's formerly independent street railways:

- Valley Passenger Railway
- Scranton Passenger Railway
- Dunmore Railway
- Scranton Suburban Railway
- Scranton Railway Company, formerly the People's Street Railway

In 1900, the system carried 10.5 million passengers.

In 1905, the railway was purchased by American Railways Company, a holding company that also owned the Altoona and Logan Valley Electric Railway, the People's Railway, the Springfield Railway Company, and other electric railways. (Note: The ARC also owned various electric utility companies through a 1901 merger with the Electric Company of America. In 1906, the Electric Company became the American Gas and Electric Company, which would be renamed American Electric Power in 1958.)

In 1907, the railway owned 47.63 miles (76.65 km) of track, and operated over 81.55 miles (131.24 km) of track. Trolleys carried 24 million passengers in 1912. A promotional book produced by the city's Board of Trade touted the "Gateway to the Clouds", a 12-mile (19 km), 54-minute ride from downtown Scranton that rose 1,200 feet (370 m) to the resort area of Lake Moosic. This route traveled over the leased Scranton, Dunmore, and Moosic Lake Railroad.

Ridership began to decline in the mid 1920s. Long suburban lines were cut back as buses began to appear. In 1923, the Scranton Railway Company asked for and received approval from the local Public Service Commission to abandon its service from Scranton to Pittston. In 1925, it abandoned service from Old Forge to Duryea, where there was a connection to Wilkes-Barre. From 1925 to 1928, the company was owned by National Public Service Corporation, which was soon taken over by Chicago businessman Samuel Insull's Middle West Utilities Company. Insull's Chicago-based business empire collapsed in 1932, whereupon the company passed to the Municipal Service Co. In 1934, the Scranton Railway was reorganized as Scranton Transit Company.

Its last trolley car ran in 1954, its lines replaced by buses.

Scranton Transit bus drivers and maintenance workers refused a new contract on November 15, 1971 over wage cuts and the company halted operations — service was never restarted. It was succeeded in 1972 by the County of Lackawanna Transit System.

== Rolling stock ==
In 1902, it operated more than 100 cars. In 1910, it operated five steam locomotives.

== Bibliography ==
- Henwood, James N. J.; Muncie, John G. (2005). Laurel Line: An Anthracite Region Railway (2nd ed.). Eynon, PA.: Tribute Books. ISBN 978-0-9765-0723-9. OCLC 62596593.
- Hilton, George W. & Due, John Fitzgerald (1960). The Electric Interurban Railways in America. Stanford, California: Stanford University Press. OCLC 237973.
- Street and Electric Railways 1902 (Report). Washington, D.C.: United States Bureau of the Census. 1905 – via Google Books.
