= Lake Lackawanna =

New Jersey lake, excavated 1908–1911

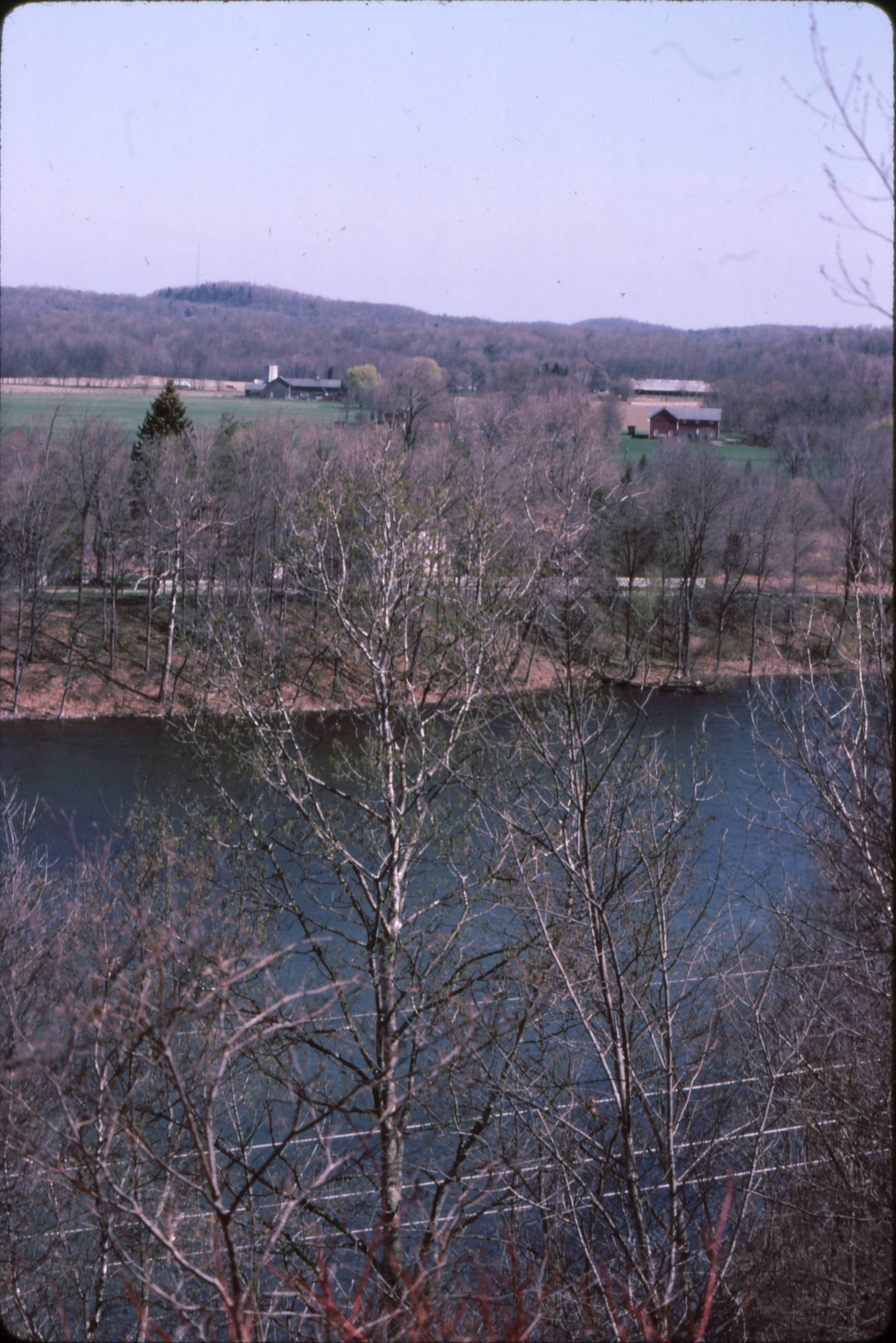

- Location within New Jersey Location within the United States
- Location: Byram Township, New Jersey
- Coordinates: 40°57′03″N 74°41′47″W
- Type: Reservoir
- Basin countries: United States
- Surface elevation: 702 ft (214 m)

Lake Lackawanna was created by the removal of fill material for the creation of Lubber Run Fill on the Lackawanna Cut-Off in northwest New Jersey, United States. The lake is fed by Lubbers Run, which was dammed when this section of the Cut-Off was constructed during the years 1908–1911.
