= Timothy Burke (businessman) =

Timothy Burke was a businessman who, with his brother John M. Burke, founded the Burke Brothers Construction Company in Scranton, Pennsylvania, and the Scranton, Dunmore, and Moosic Lake Railroad.

Born in Ireland, the Burkes emigrated with their parents to the United States and settled in New York state. They first worked as laborers and helped to build an aqueduct in the Catskill Mountains. After learning the masonry and construction trades, they moved to the burgeoning industrial city of Scranton and in 1882 established their construction company. Their first job was to build the Lake Scranton Dam. Later, the Delaware, Lackawanna and Western Railroad hired the company to make various improvements on its line from Milburn to Summit, New Jersey, including raising the roadbed, widening the curves, and eliminating grade crossings.

The brothers used the profits to create a new resort outside of Scranton. They bought 5,000 acres of land, including Moosic Lake, on Moosic Mountain, and created a standard-gauge railway, the Scranton, Dunmore, and Moosic Lake Railroad, to serve the area. Incorporated on June 8, 1902, the railroad's 9 miles of track plus 0.5 miles of sidings ran from Dunmore to the lake, and were completed in 1903. The brothers also built a bathhouse, arcade, and docks on the lake. The railroad, which originally was powered by steam locomotives, was leased in 1910 to the Scranton Railway and subsequently electrified. It closed in 1926.

In 1908-11, Burke's construction company built the easternmost 2.5 miles—"Section 1"—of the Lackawanna Cut-Off, the Lackawanna Railroad's immense project intended to create a high-speed rail line across the hills of northern New Jersey.

During this project, John Burke left the partnership and joined Hyde-McFarlan, a New York-based firm that was building Section 5 of the Cut-Off; the firm was renamed Hyde, McFarlan & Burke.
