= Roseville Tunnel =

Rail tunnel in New Jersey

Coordinates: 40.971043°N 74.710550°W

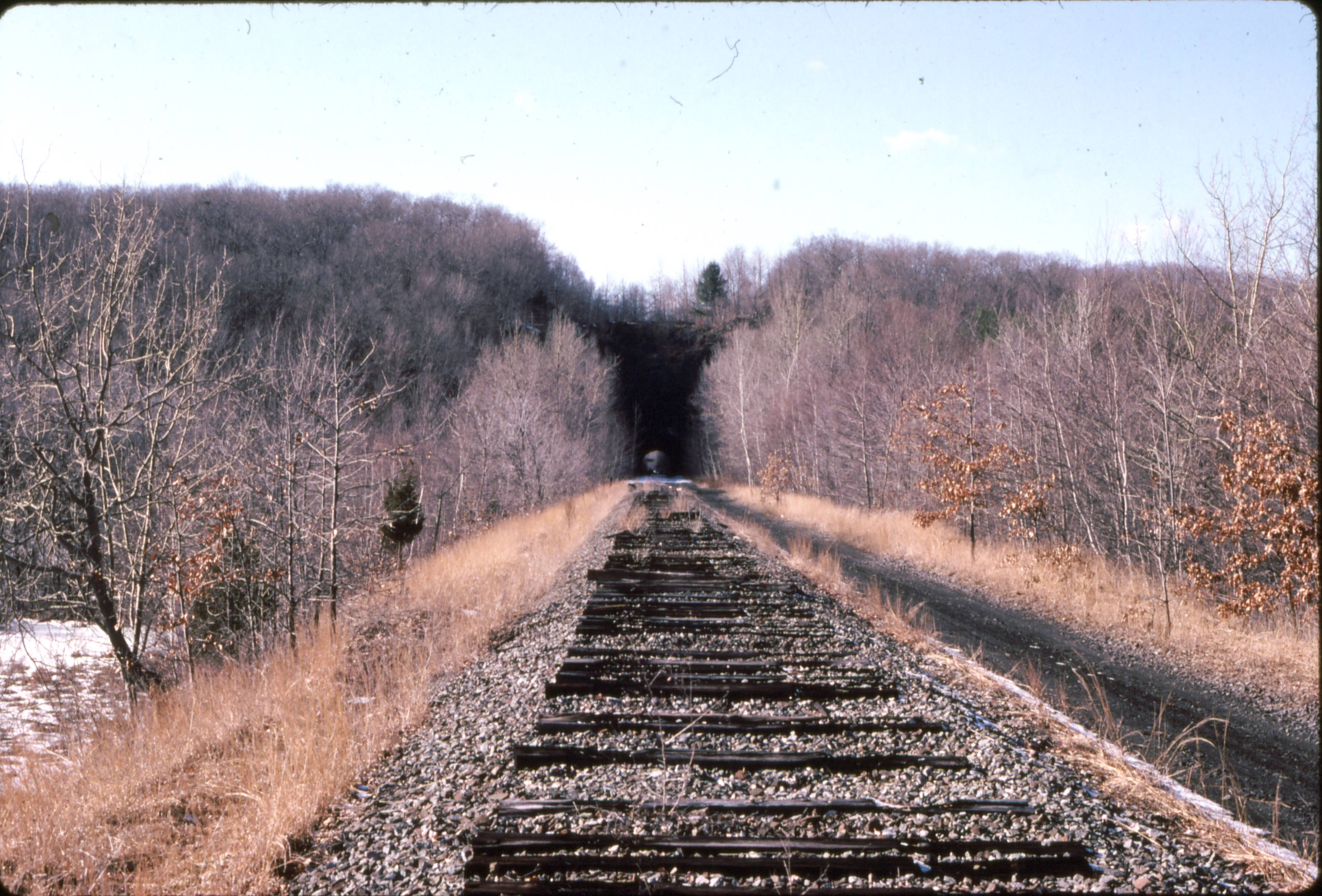
The eastern portal of Roseville Tunnel in 1989, five years after the tracks were removed from the Lackawanna Cut-Off. The hill above was partially blasted away in the aborted effort to create an open cut, not a tunnel.

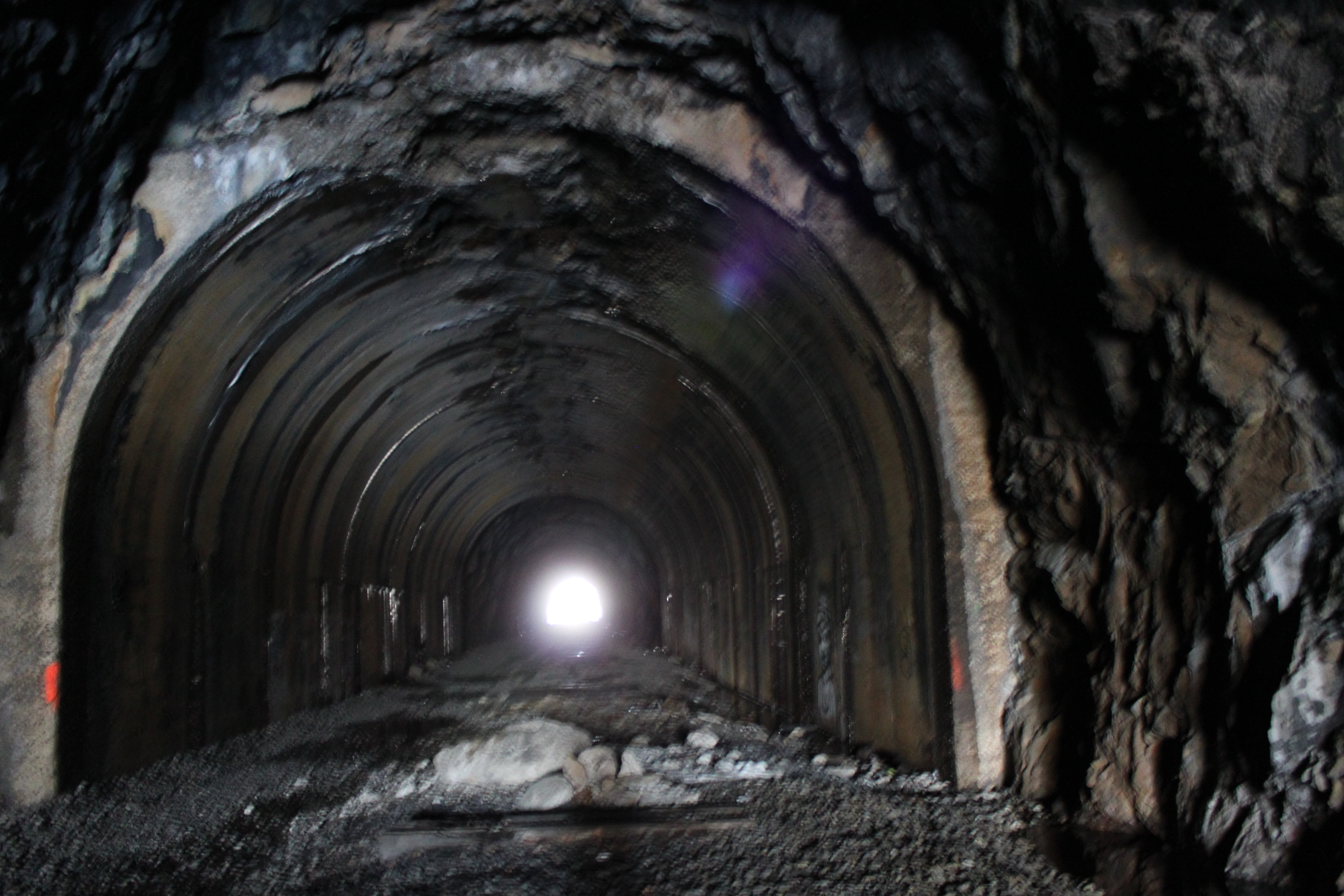
Eastbound view of the interior of Roseville Tunnel, near the west portal, on April 21, 2011. A 100-foot (30 m) section of concrete lining, applied during the 1970s, failed to eliminate drainage problems.

Roseville Tunnel is a 1,000-foot (300 m) two-track railroad tunnel on the Lackawanna Cut-Off in Byram Township, Sussex County, New Jersey. The tunnel is on a straight section of railroad between mileposts 51.6 and 51.8 (83 km), about 6 miles (9.7 km) north by northwest of Port Morris Junction. Operated for freight and passenger service from 1911 to 1979, it is undergoing work (including the shortening of the tunnel from its original length of 1,020-foot (310 m)) intended to return it to passenger service by 2026.

== History ==
The tunnel was built between 1908 and 1911 by the Delaware, Lackawanna and Western Railroad (DL&W) as part of the Lackawanna Cut-Off, an immense, spare-no-expense project intended to create the straightest, flattest route practicable for its main line through the mountains of northwestern New Jersey. The contract to build the section near Roseville was awarded to David W. Flickwir of Roanoke, Virginia.

Originally, the DL&W had planned to have a cut, not a tunnel, at this location. At 140 feet (43 m) deep, it would have been the deepest on the Cut-Off. But in October 1909, anticlinal rock was encountered, described as "bastard granite", which contractors said was "so brittle and soft that you could scoop it up by the handful. It was white in color and looked much like Roquefort cheese." The fear was that this decayed rock could not be relied upon to provide sufficiently rigid support for a cut. As a result, DL&W Assistant Chief Engineer Wheaton recommended that a tunnel be drilled instead, and President William Truesdale concurred. Work to bore a tunnel starting in December 1909. Ultimately, some 35,000 cubic yards of material were removed to create the bore.

Roseville Tunnel opened on December 24, 1911, and permitted a 70 mph (113 km/h) speed limit. In 1958, the DL&W single-tracked the line in anticipation of the 1960 merger with the Erie Railroad. Its successor, the Erie Lackawanna Railway (EL), shifted the remaining track in the tunnel several feet north in the 1970s in order to boost clearance for high-and-wide railroad cars. Conrail assumed operations of the EL in 1976.

In January 1979, Conrail placed the Cut-Off out-of-service. The railroad beat off a protracted effort to prevent the tracks from being removed, and pulled up the rails in 1984. Conrail later sold the right-of-way to Jerry Turco, a developer based in Kearny, New Jersey.

In 2001, the State of New Jersey acquired the right-of-way. Ten years later, NJ Transit began to rebuild the line as part of the Lackawanna Cut-Off Restoration Project.

== Rockslides ==
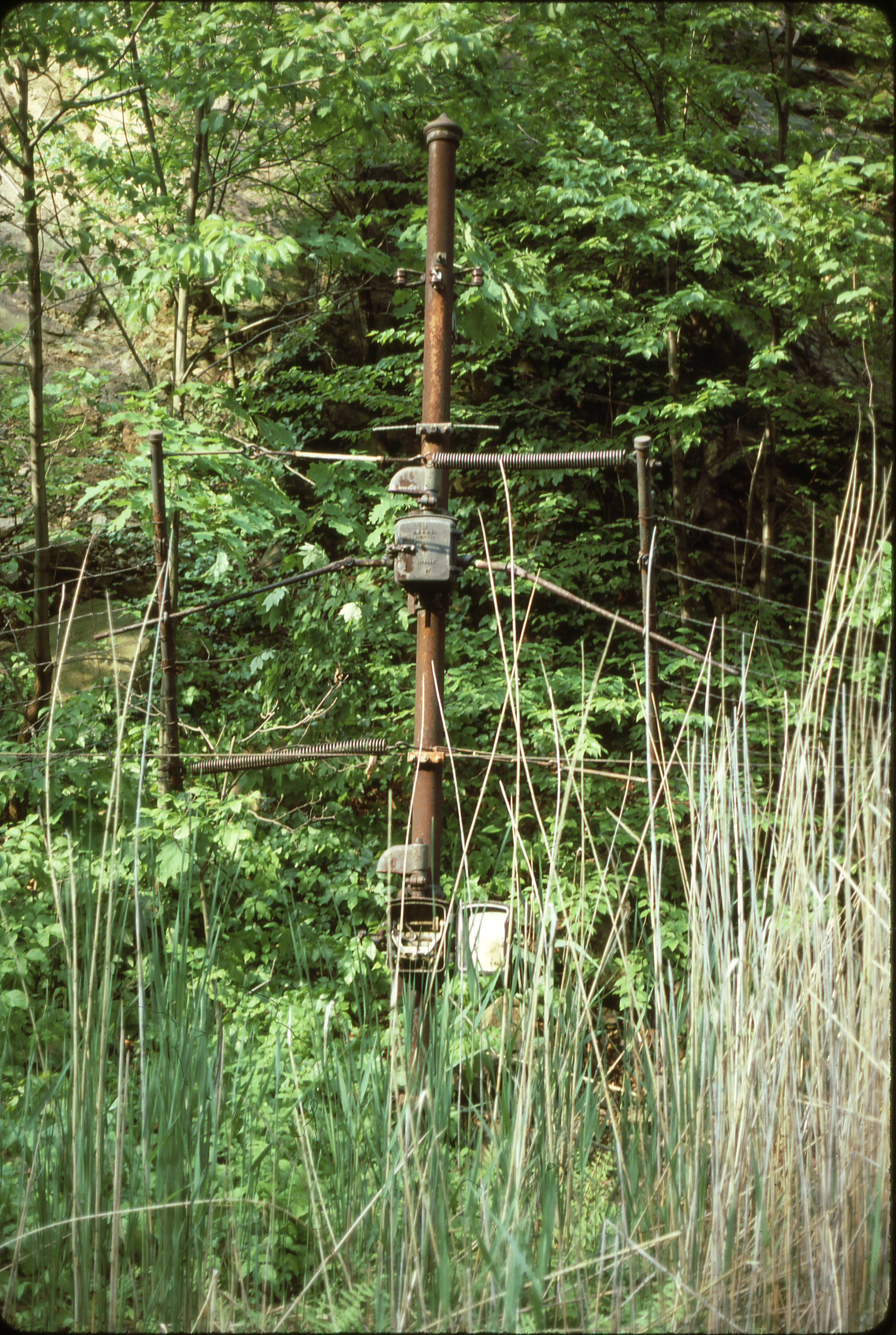
A 1988 photo of a rockslide detector in Colby Cut just west of Roseville Tunnel. If a rock breaks through the screen, the trackside signals are automatically set to stop.

New Jersey geology makes rockslides, which can derail trains, a constant threat in deep cuts. After the Cut-Off was closed for a month by a 1941 slide in Armstrong Cut just west of Johnsonburg, DL&W brought in heavy equipment to lessen the slope on the cut's northern side, making it nearly impossible for another rockslide to occur there.

But Roseville proved a different matter. Unless the Lackawanna was willing to close the line for a prolonged period, there was no way to safely scale back the tall, steep rockwalls through Colby Cut, the tunnel's western approach. Instead, after the Armstrong Cut Slide, the DL&W paid a shantyman to watch for fallen rocks and clear ice at Roseville. A hand-thrown switch had already been installed in 1913 to allow trains to shift tracks if one were blocked by fallen rocks, indicating that the railroad was acutely aware of the potential threat from almost the very beginning. In later years (probably around 1950), electronic detectors were installed that could automatically set trackside signals to red if rocks broke through the detector fencing. In the 1970s, a concrete lining was applied to the westernmost 133 feet (41 m) of the tunnel to prevent rockfalls inside. This work did not prevent chunks of rock from dislodging later on, after the abandonment of the Cut-Off.

== Rehabilitation for Andover service ==
In 2011, New Jersey Transit received approval to re-lay 7.3 miles (11.8 km) of track from Port Morris Junction through the tunnel in order to open commuter rail service westward to Andover, New Jersey.

Eleven years passed before the next tangible step toward the work on Roseville Tunnel. On April 13, 2022, the NJ Transit Board of Directors approved a $32.5 million contract to Schiavone Construction Company of Secaucus, New Jersey. Under the contract, Schiavone will build 8,000 feet of track bed, strengthen and stabilize the tunnel interior, remove at least 15 to 20 feet of the tunnel (bringing the tunnel to just under 1,000 feet (300 m) in length), improve drainage, create an interior pedestrian path, and install a radio system and security cameras. It will also replace two culverts: the one at Hudson Farm, about 500 feet upstream from the Andover station site; and the Andover Junction Brook culvert at the future station. The work is to be completed within early 2025.

Restoration of the whole line to Andover is slated for completion in late 2026.
