= Luzerne County Transportation Authority =

Transportation operator in Wilkes-Barre, Pennsylvania

- Headquarters: 300 S Pennsylvania Avenue. Wilkes-Barre, Pennsylvania, U.S.
- Service area: Wilkes-Barre and Luzerne County, Pennsylvania
- Service type: Bus, Microtransit
- Routes: 26
- Hubs: James F. Conahan Intermodal (marked as Wilkes-Barre Transit Center on buses and schedules)
- Fuel type: Gasoline, compressed natural gas
- Website: lctabus.com

The Luzerne County Transportation Authority (LCTA) is the operator of mass transportation in the city of Wilkes-Barre, Pennsylvania, and portions of surrounding Luzerne County. The LCTA is governed by a nine-member board, appointed by the Luzerne County Council.

== History ==
Services provided by the LCTA replaced previously offered services of the White Transit Company and Wilkes-Barre Transit Corporation, under a purchase-of-service agreement in 1972. The system's hub at Public Square was replaced by the James F. Conahan Intermodal Transportation Center on Washington Street, which opened on July 6, 2010. The LCTA shares the bus boarding platforms with Martz Trailways and Fullington Trailways.

On August 1, 2019, LCTA was renamed the Northeast Pennsylvania Transportation Authority (NEPTA). However, on August 26, the name change was reverted due to concerns regarding the removal of the county's name and the board's ability to change the name without the county's permission. On November 11, 2024, the bus routes were redesigned and 3 new Microtransit zones were added, under the name LCTA Connects.

== Fleet ==
LCTA operates a fleet of 38 Gillig Low Floor buses, all the 35-foot (11 m) variant, that run on compressed natural gas.
