= Hyde, McFarlan & Burke =

- Industry: Construction
- Headquarters: New York City; Madison, U.S.
- Key people: John Burke (joined 1908)

Hyde, McFarlan & Burke (sometimes given as Hyde, McFarlane & Burke; Hyde, McFarland & Burke; and Hyde, McFarlin & Burke) was a construction firm that operated in the early 20th century from offices at 90 West Street in New York City and Madison, New Jersey. The company did much work for the Delaware, Lackawanna and Western Railroad, including the construction of miles 60.8 to 65.8 of the landmark Lackawanna Cut-Off, which required the movement of millions of tons of fill material using techniques similar to those used on the Panama Canal.

Founded as Hyde-McFarlan Co., the firm was renamed after the 1908 arrival of John Burke from Burke Brothers, another firm doing work on the Cut-Off.

In 1921, the firm purchased a used 20-ton Industrial locomotive crane from the Hog Island shipyard south of Philadelphia, Pennsylvania.
