= East Stroudsburg station =

Railway station in East Stroudsburg, Pennsylvania

East Stroudsburg
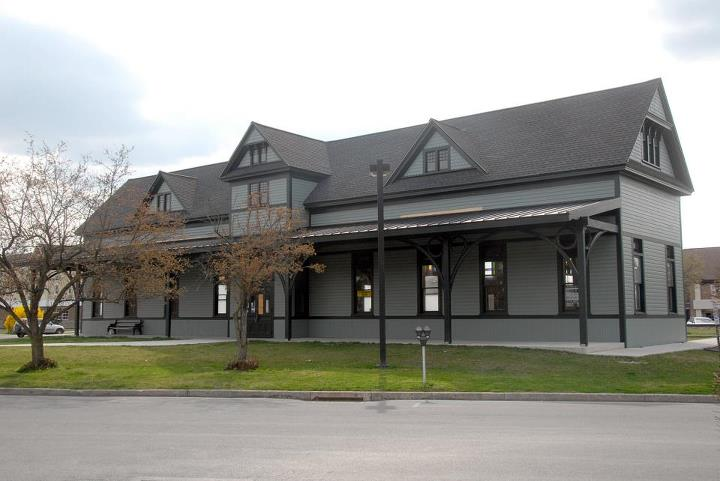

General information
- Location: 5 South Kistler Street, East Stroudsburg, Pennsylvania
- Owner: Pennsylvania Northeast Regional Railroad Authority
- Line: Pocono Mainline
- Tracks: 1

Construction
- Parking: 228 spaces (proposed)

Other information
- Station code: 82 (D&LW)

History
- Opened: 1856
- Closed: January 5, 1970

Former services
Preceding station	Delaware, Lackawanna and Western Railroad	Following station
Analomink toward Buffalo	Main Line	Delaware Water Gap toward Hoboken
Preceding station	Pennsylvania Railroad	Following station
Terminus	Belvidere Delaware Railroad	Delaware Water Gap toward Trenton

Proposed services
Preceding station	NJ Transit	Following station
Analomink toward Scranton	Lackawanna Cut-Off	Delaware Water Gap toward New York or Hoboken
- East Stroudsburg Railroad Station
- U.S. National Register of Historic Places
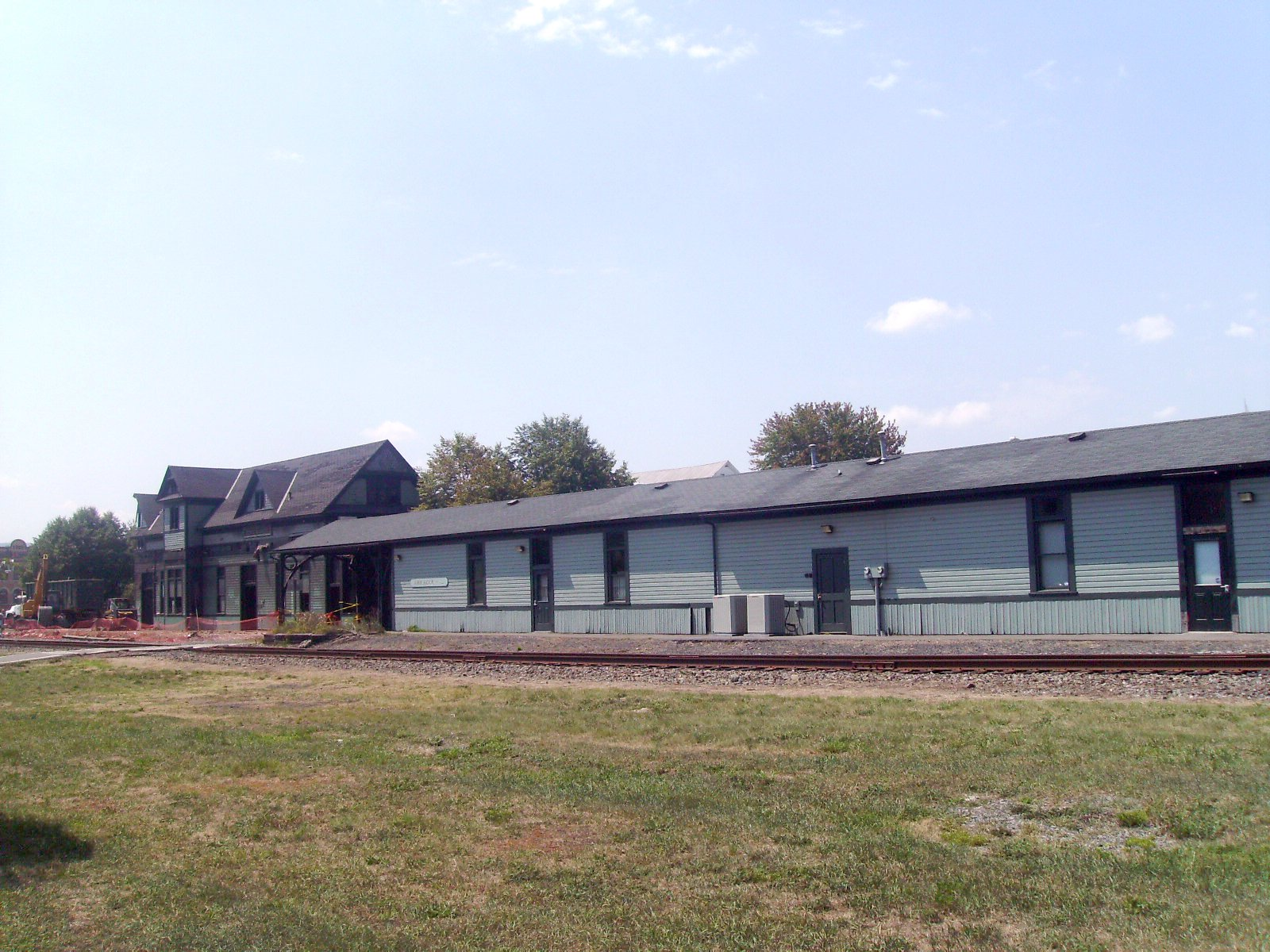
- The East Stroudsburg station in July 2010, in the process of demolition.

- Location within Pennsylvania Location within the United States
- Location: Crystal Street, East Stroudsburg, Pennsylvania
- Coordinates: 40°59′56″N 75°10′55″W
- Area: 0.2 acres (0.08 ha)
- Built: 1856
- Architectural style: Queen Anne
- NRHP reference No.: 80003572
- Added to NRHP: June 27, 1980
Location

East Stroudsburg is a historic train station built by the Delaware, Lackawanna and Western Railroad in 1856. The station served as the local stop for both East Stroudsburg and Stroudsburg, Pennsylvania. The depot, recently known locally as the Dansbury Depot for the restaurant that used the building, is located on Crystal Street in East Stroudsburg. Service to East Stroudsburg ended on January 6, 1970, when the Erie Lackawanna Railway discontinued the Lake Cities. A proposal is currently in place to extend NJ Transit service to a rebuilt East Stroudsburg station. In spring 2021, Amtrak announced plans for potential New York–Scranton route. It is currently used by some of Steamtown National Historic Site's excursion trains.

== History ==
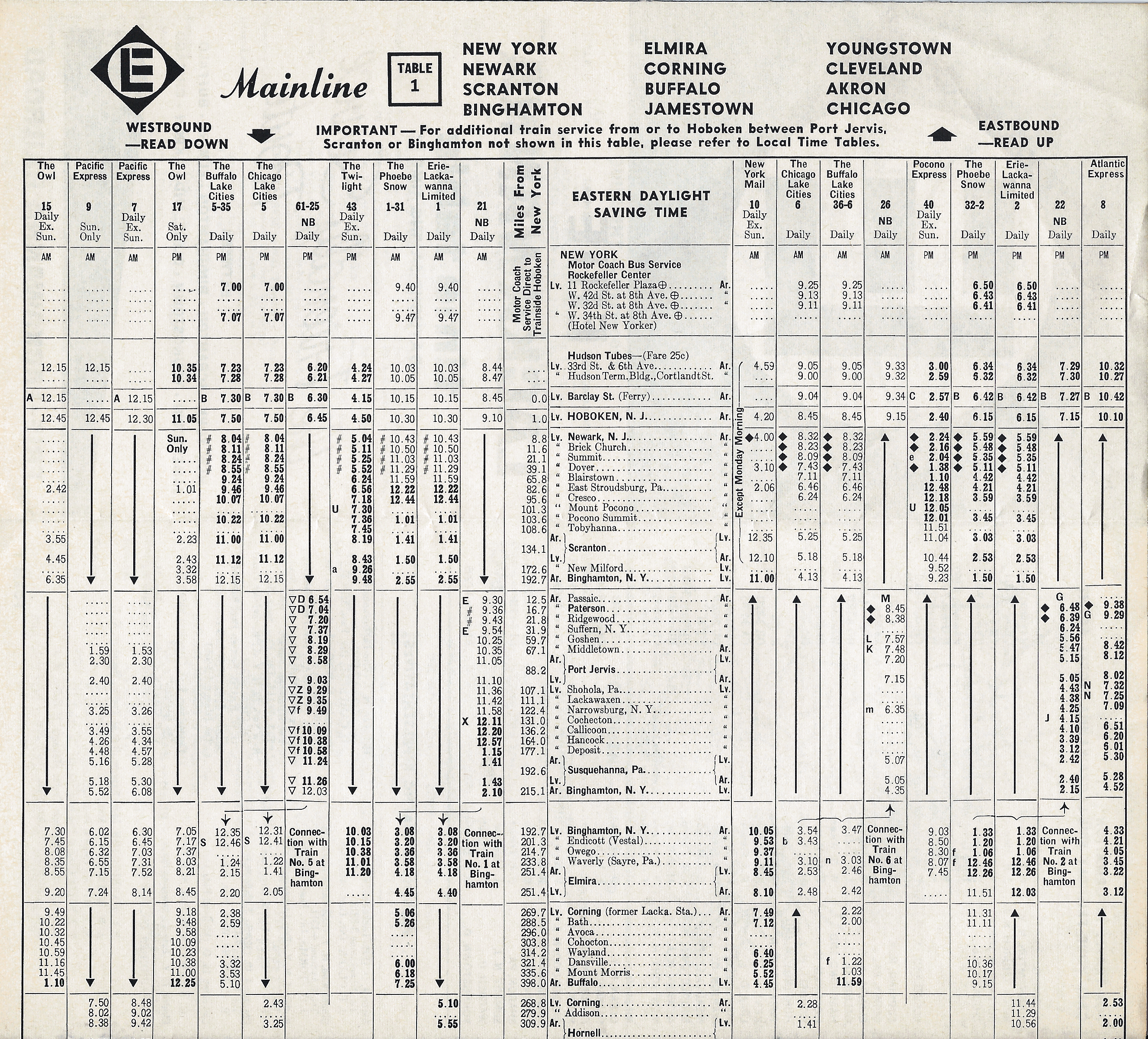
Erie Lackawanna Railroad timetable documenting trains making stops at East Stroudsburg station in 1961

The station had served several Delaware, Lackawanna and Western Railroad and then Erie-Lackwanna passenger trains. Aside from the Lake Cities, these included the Owl/New York Mail, Twilight/Pocono Express and the DL&W flagship train, the Phoebe Snow.

== Station building ==
=== Redevelopment ===
The Stroudsburg area is served by Interstate 80, which links the Pocono Mountains to North Jersey and New York City. High traffic volumes on the highway routinely cause congestion beginning at the Delaware Water Gap (just east of the Stroudsburg area) and extending across New Jersey towards New York City. The former DL&W "cutoff" mainline roughly parallels I-80 across New Jersey, and could potentially alleviate congestion on the highway once tracks are fully-restored between Slateford Junction, PA and Port Morris, NJ (28.6 miles).

On October 26, 2009, a fire rushed through the station depot.

In early July, 2010 local developer Troy Nauman entered a contract to purchase the East Stroudsburg station, and announced plans to demolish the historic station and replace it with a new three-story apartment building. The impending loss of the station caught the community by surprise, and several preservation movements were started by residents, several of whom coalesced under the Save the Dansbury Depot Citizens Group. The group lobbied elected officials for a "cooling-off" period and attempted to negotiate a waiting period with the station's new owner, who had announced plans to redevelop the site. Its Facebook page attracted over 3,600 members who were urged to attend local public meetings and donate funds to save the building.

Preservation efforts included a pledge of $500,000 from Dr. Joseph Mattioli, who owned Pocono Raceway in Long Pond, Pennsylvania. Although a judge delayed the demolition with an injunction on July 24, 2010, it was reversed by another judge only four days later and demolition had begun, despite much outcry.

=== New location ===
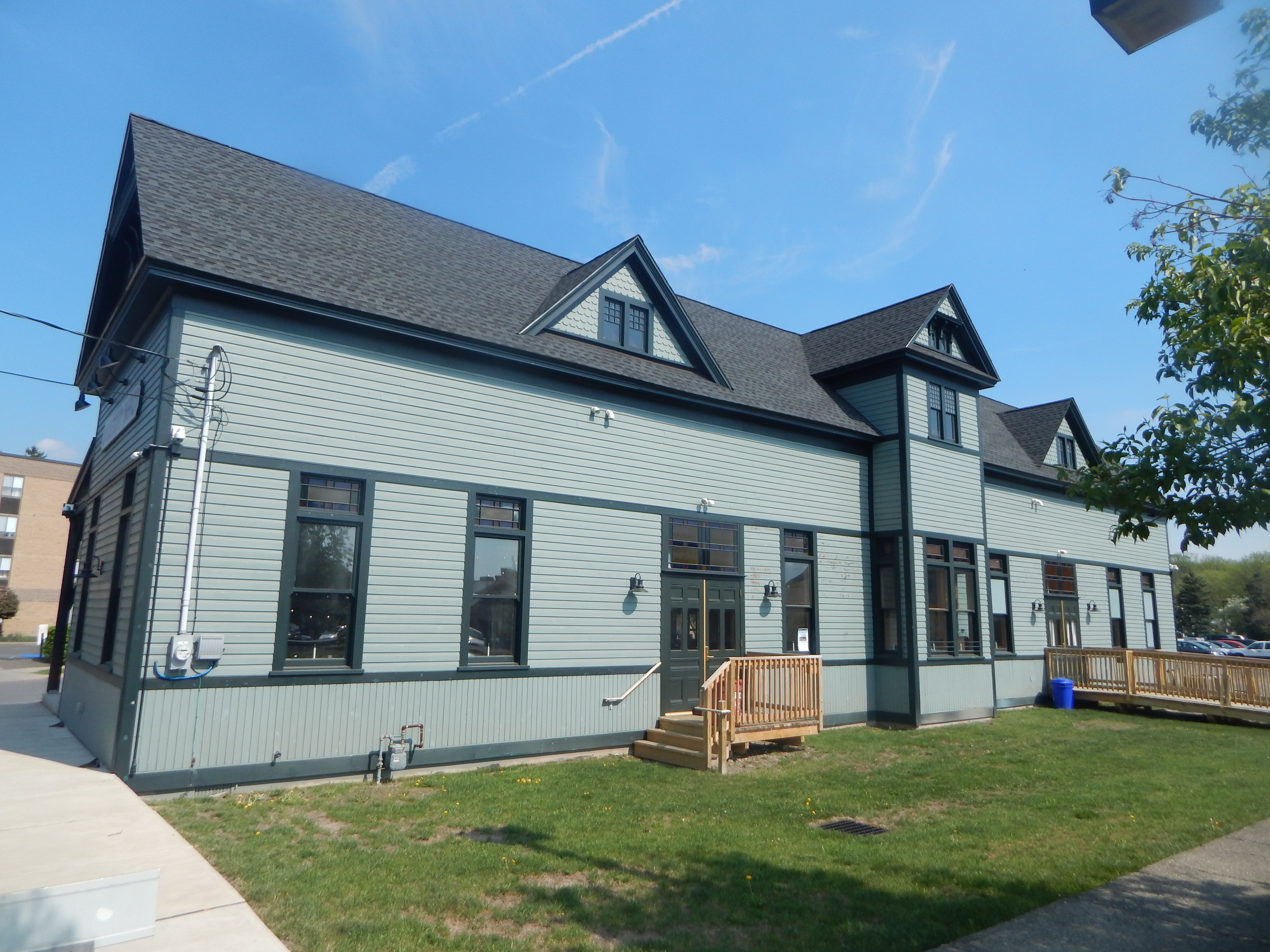
East Stroudsburg station in May 2015, post-restoration

In response to public outcry, a plan for rehabilitation and reuse of the oldest part of the original station was implemented by The Eastburg Community Alliance. In spite of the start of demolition, no significant part of the original station was lost. The station itself was moved temporarily to a public parking lot on the eastern side of the Pennsylvania Northeast Regional Railroad Authority railroad track, to await a concrete pad on which to be set permanently.

As of the Summer of 2011, the station has been set on a new permanent foundation across the tracks from its original site. Renovation work was underway to return the station to its earlier appearance with the Lackawanna railroad. The side of the station facing the tracks is the face that had originally faced the tracks; the station was spun 180 degrees during its move.

The station is just a stone's throw from the Lackawanna Signal Tower, also being preserved by a local group.

Even though the DL&W railroad has long been out of business, one track from Stroudsburg west to Scranton and beyond is still in use. The Delaware–Lackawanna Railroad runs a short-line freight service on the line. Scranton is also the home of Steamtown National Historic Site. Some tourist excursions from Scranton (less than 50 highway miles away) to Stroudsburg also use the remaining track. Crossing signals have been upgraded to meet current standards.

The original station site has been developed—the proposed apartment building has been built next to the track. The original platform shed, closed-in when the station was converted to other commercial uses, still exists as an extension of the new apartment building.

== NJT station ==
NJ Transit, the commuter railroad primarily feeding the New York City and Philadelphia areas, has purchased the former DL&W right-of-way in New Jersey and has begun re-laying track at the eastern end of the New Jersey Cutoff, with the intent of relaying track westward across New Jersey to re-connect the DL&W rails through to Stroudsburg.

As part of that rebuilding, New Jersey and Pennsylvania plan to include a station stop in East Stroudsburg. The plan is for a station just south of the former station site, located between the track and Crystal Street. It is proposed to have 228 parking spaces and one side level platform. The station is about 80 miles (130 km) from New York City, and would become part of the new Lackawanna Cut-Off line ultimately sought between Port Morris, New Jersey and Scranton, Pennsylvania. The Lackawanna Cut-Off Restoration Project is underway for restoring passenger service to East Stroudsburg and the Pocono Mountains. The NJ Transit board approved in April 2022 a $32.5 million contract for improving a tunnel and restoring track to part of the line between Blairstown, New Jersey and Port Morris, New Jersey, a segment in which trackage had been removed in the 1980s.
