= Scranton station =

Scranton station could refer to three train stations in Scranton, Pennsylvania:

- Scranton station (NJ Transit), a proposed station
- Scranton station (Central Railroad of New Jersey)
- Radisson Lackawanna Station Hotel, the former Delaware, Lackawanna, and Western Railroad station
