= Lackawanna Cut-Off Restoration Project =

American railway infrastructure project

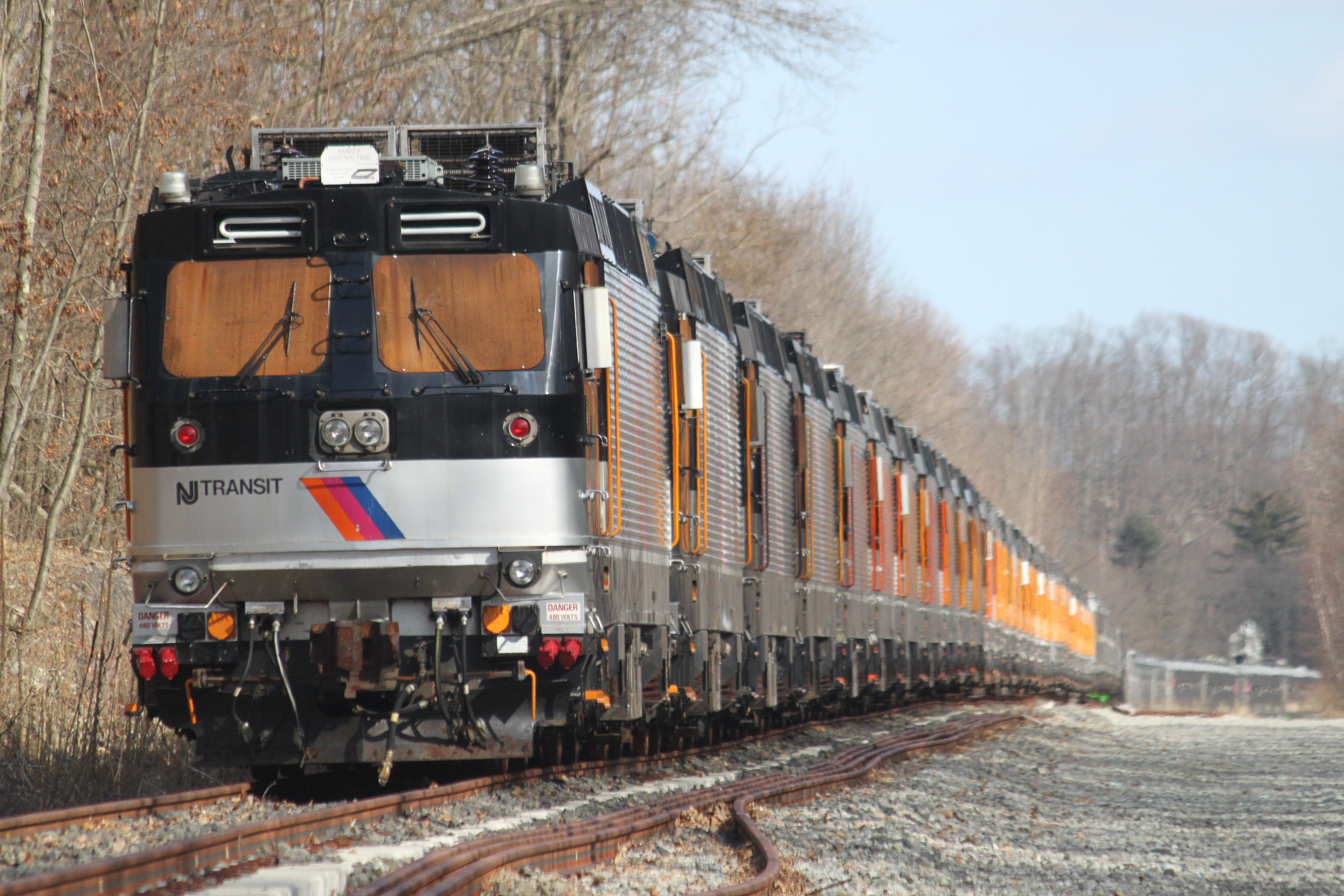
A line of former NJ Transit ALP-44 electric locomotives stored on the Lackawanna Cut-Off near Port Morris. Photographed in April 2013, the locomotives were finally cut up in early 2026.

The Lackawanna Cut-Off Restoration Project is a New Jersey Transit and Amtrak effort to restore passenger service to the Lackawanna Cut-Off rail line in northwest New Jersey.

Phase 1 of the project, launched in 2011, is slated to extend NJ Transit's commuter rail service 7.3 miles (11.7 km) from Port Morris Junction in Morris County to Andover in Sussex County, bringing passenger trains to Andover for the first time in more than half a century. Service to Penn Station will require electro-diesel locomotives (such as NJ Transit's Bombardier ALP-45DP locomotives) because the North River Tunnels cannot accommodate diesel engines.

Initial steps have been taken in other phases of the project, which aim to rebuild the remainder of the Cut-Off to Northeastern Pennsylvania and relaunch train service between New York City and Scranton. In 2020, Amtrak included the route in its 15-year expansion vision. In December 2023, the Federal Railroad Administration accepted the route into its Corridor Identification and Development Program, which allocates money for planning and prioritizes the project for future funding.

== Operations (1908–79) ==
Built between 1908 and 1911 by the Delaware, Lackawanna & Western Railroad (DL&W) to speed service between Hoboken, New Jersey, and Buffalo, New York, the 28.45-mile (45.79 km) Lackawanna Cut-Off was the last main line built in New Jersey. The line was considered an engineering marvel—a "super-railroad", in the vernacular of the day—with deep cuts, tall fills, and two large viaducts that allowed a mostly straight route through the mountains of the state's northwest region. Although the DL&W was profitable during its corporate life, competition from trucks and other economic pressures after World War II forced it to merge with competitor Erie Railroad, forming the Erie Lackawanna Railroad (EL) in 1960.

The EL initially shifted most freight traffic away from the Cut-Off, though it continued to run passenger trains over the line. The railroad's flagship passenger train, the Phoebe Snow, traveled via the Cut-Off until it was discontinued in November 1966, and the last regularly scheduled passenger train, the Lake Cities, ran over the line on January 5–6, 1970. After May 8, 1974, freight traffic was revived on the line after the closure of a key junction with the Penn Central in Maybrook, New York, caused by fire damage to the ex-New York, New Haven and Hartford Railroad Poughkeepsie Bridge. The conveyance of EL into Conrail on April 1, 1976, gave Conrail excess east–west trackage, however, and service on the Cut-Off ended in January 1979. (Conrail officials later said they might not have abandoned the Scranton Route, including the Cut-Off, if the EL had not severed a section of the Boonton Branch near Paterson, New Jersey, in the early 1960s for the construction of Interstate 80.)

== Early preservation efforts (1979–86) ==
Efforts to preserve the Cut-Off began almost immediately upon the route's closing. In November 1979, Amtrak operated an inspection train between Hoboken and Scranton to investigate intercity rail service between the two cities. Dubbed the "Pocono Mountain Special", the train left Hoboken and ran west on the Morristown Line on November 13, 1979, reaching Port Morris shortly after 9 a.m. With the main line severed at Port Morris Junction, the special train detoured through Port Morris Yard, ran over Port Morris Wye, and then rolled onto the Cut-Off. The train ran to Scranton, where it was met by a group of political dignitaries. It was the last passenger train in the twentieth century—and the only Amtrak train—to operate over the entire route. The idea of Hoboken–Scranton service faded as Amtrak faced funding shortfalls and the need for significant track and station repairs in order to run passenger service on the line.

The 133-mile (214 km) inspection trip marked the end of one era, and the beginning of another: a 40-plus-year effort to save and then reactivate the Cut-Off. In the beginning, finding an operator for the line was less pressing than preserving the track and right-of-way itself. Several attempts were made to purchase the line from Conrail, which was concerned that a competitor might try to restore freight service on the route. The Sussex County Freeholder Board in New Jersey pursued such a purchase.

The Monroe County Railroad Authority in Pennsylvania was also involved, and nearly reached a deal to buy the 88-mile (142 km) section of track between Port Morris and Scranton for $6.5 million. The railroad authority would have borrowed $4.1 million from the federal government at 3.25 percent per annum and issued bonds to cover the rest of the purchase price plus additional unspecified costs to restore the line. The deal would have allowed Conrail to remove about 40 miles (64 km) of track with an option for Pennsylvania, through the Pennsylvania Department of Transportation (PennDOT), to purchase the second track to Moscow, Pennsylvania, for operations out of Scranton's Steamtown National Historic Site. The agreement stipulated that the railroad operator would repay the loan from operational revenue.

In spite of initial optimism, the deal began to fall apart, and on August 10, 1983, the U.S. Department of Transportation informed Monroe County officials that the federal loan guarantee had been revoked and would instead go to the financially ailing Detroit & Mackinac Railway in Michigan. Monroe County officials continued to press their case, hoping that Congress would provide financial support; the railroad authority invited 16 potential operators to submit proposals, and seven did so on August 26, 1983. Meanwhile, the federal regulations surrounding the abandonment of railroad lines changed; instead of a lengthy regulatory process that had discouraged railroads from abandoning unwanted routes, the Interstate Commerce Commission (ICC) would be allowed to approve the abandonment of any track if it were not in service and had no originating or terminating shipments for two years, and was not required to serve any other track. This allowed Conrail to abandon the Cut-Off almost immediately. Atlantic City gambling interests also opposed restoring rail service over the Cut-Off, fearing renewed passenger service would provide a "Gambler's Express" to not-as-yet-built casinos in the Poconos that might compete with the nascent casinos of the Jersey Shore. A New Jersey Department of Transportation (NJDOT) priority list of rail projects at the time listed the Cut-Off as Number 26 in a list of unfunded capital projects.

The Monroe County Railroad Authority continued to fight Conrail, with support from PennDOT and the threat of the use of a privately owned World War II tank to block any Conrail rail-removal train. Conrail eventually relented and agreed not to sever the line between Slateford and Scranton.

=== Track removal ===
With all regulatory and political hurdles removed in New Jersey, however, Conrail began lifting track on the New Jersey side of the Delaware River Viaduct on June 8, 1984. Even as this was taking place, Morris County Transportation Department director Frank Reilly made last-ditch attempts to delay track removal in New Jersey. In addition, the dismantling was hampered to a minor degree by people who replaced railroad spikes removed by the crew. Also, members of the Conrail track-removal crew later admitted to "dragging their feet" in the hopes that a delay in the track removal might result in the saving of the line. These efforts proved to be in vain, however, as the last mainline trackage would be removed from the Cut-Off at Port Morris on October 5, 1984. Wooden ties and rock ballast were left in place, which was unusual since Conrail's standard abandonment practice involved removing all components (rails, wooden ties, signals, poles, rock ballast) when dismantling a railroad.

With track removal complete, the 27 miles (43 km) of right-of-way west of County Road 602 (Brooklyn-Stanhope Road) in Hopatcong, New Jersey, was sold to Jerry Turco, a developer based in Kearny, New Jersey. Turco said that he originally had no intention of purchasing the Cut-Off, but rather had learned of its availability from Conrail after he inquired about a 1,000-foot (300 m) section of the Lehigh & Hudson River Railway (L&HR) in Andover, an abandoned line that Conrail also owned. Turco said he wanted to acquire the short section so that he could expand a nursing home operation that abutted the roadbed. Conrail refused to sell the isolated Andover parcel, but later offered to sell it if Turco would acquire all of the L&HR right-of-way from Sparta to Belvidere, a total of 32 miles (51 km). Turco said that it was during this time that Conrail offered the Cut-Off, which crosses the L&HR on the Pequest Fill near Tranquility, New Jersey, to create a package deal.

Turco eventually accepted the deal to purchase both abandoned rail lines, acquiring nearly 60 miles (97 km) of right-of-way for roughly $2 million. Shortly thereafter, Conrail sold the remaining 1 1/2-mile (2.4 km) parcel east of Sussex County Road 602 to developer Burton Goldmeier of Hopatcong, who reportedly wanted to use that section of the Cut-Off as an access road to a proposed housing development. (Conrail would remove the tracks from the L&HR in 1988.)

== Later preservation and restoration efforts (1986–2008) ==
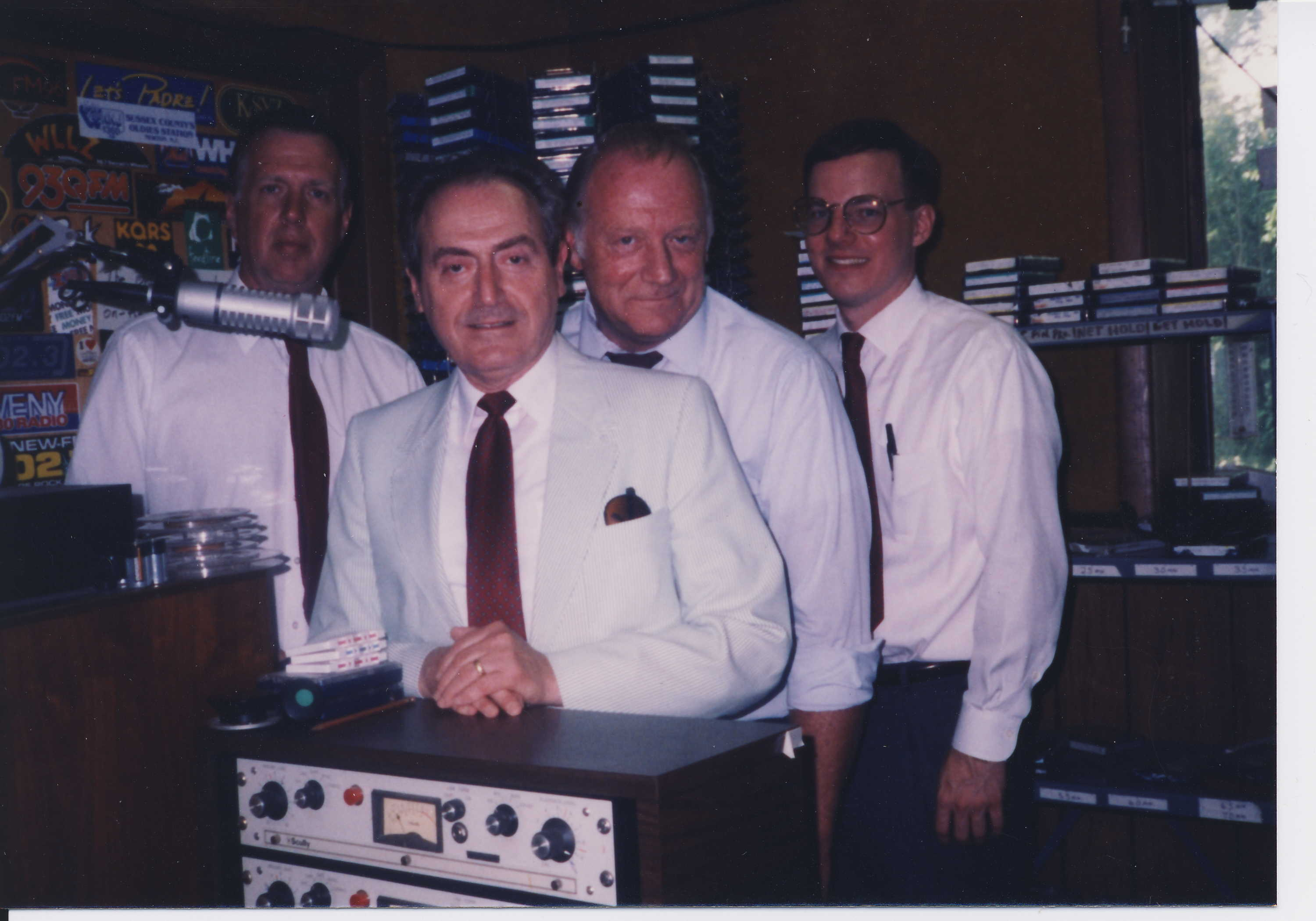
Rail officials promoting the restoration of service on the Lackawanna Cut-Off and the 1989 New Jersey bond issue for the acquisition of rail rights-of-way on WFMV, a radio station located in the Blairstown station

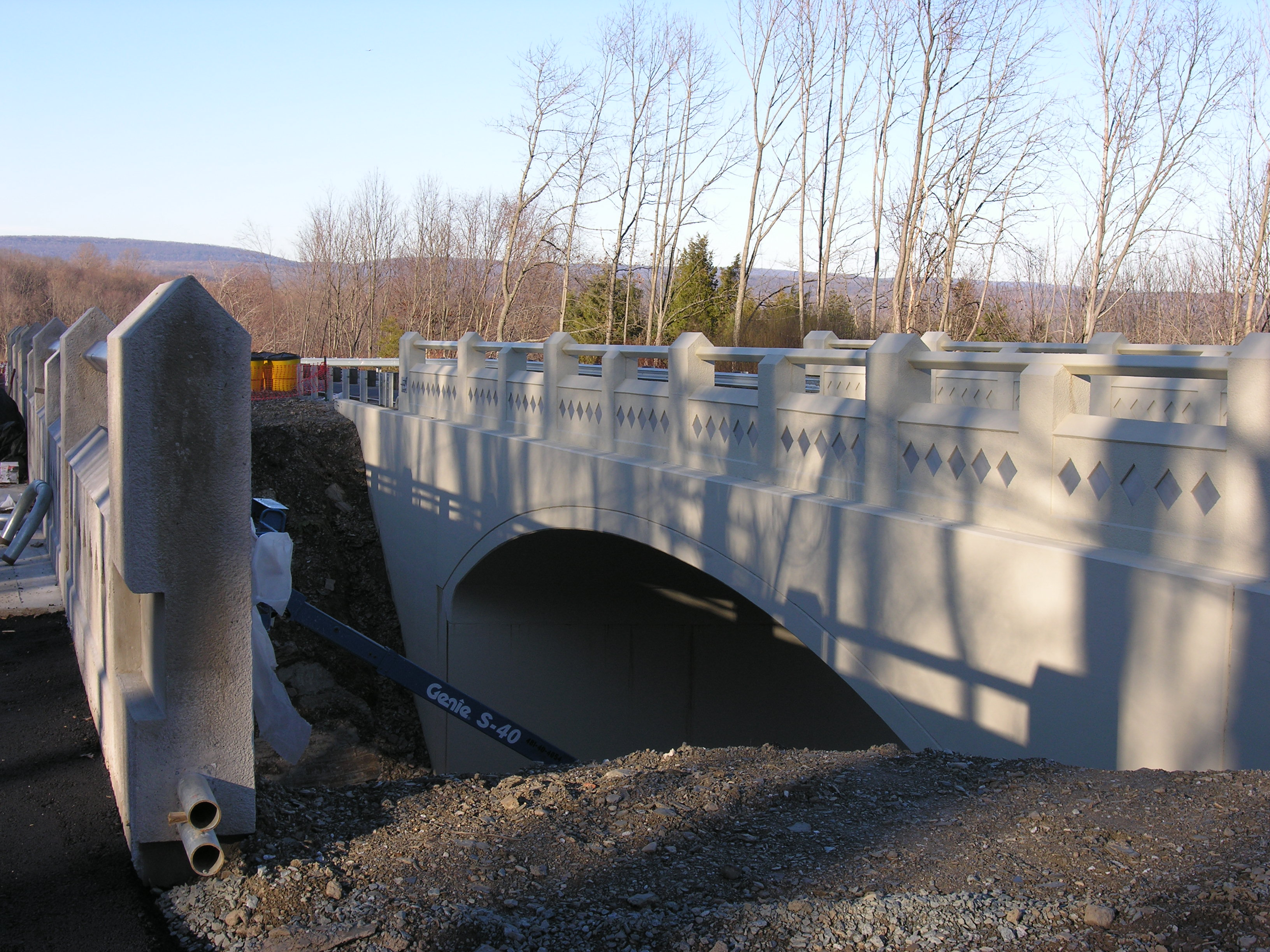
Preservation efforts during the 1980s led to a newly configured crossing of the Cut-Off on County Route 521 in Blairstown. This is a November 2006 replica.

The removal of the rails and the sale of the right-of-way to private developers made restoration of the Cut-Off more challenging. Then they got worse when Turco announced plans, at the time of his acquisition of the right-of-way, to remove fill material from the Pequest Fill and other large Cut-Off fills for the Westway Project in New York City and to dump garbage and construction materials into the large cuts. The Westway Project was abandoned in September 1985, but there were other projects that Turco could have supplied fill material to, but as time went on Turco apparently saw greater opportunity elsewhere. As such, it was never entirely clear how serious Turco was about his proposed Rebar Landfill or if this was simply a ploy to stir up public opposition and force the New Jersey state government to step in and acquire the Cut-Off by condemnation. In any case, the proposal helped galvanize support for preserving the Cut-Off.

In November 1989, New Jersey citizens voted on a $25 million state bond issue for acquiring abandoned railroad rights-of-way. After they approved it overwhelmingly, NJDOT instituted eminent domain proceedings against the corporations that Turco and Goldmeier had established in New Jersey for the Cut-Off.

For liability purposes, Turco had established separate corporations for the parcels of right-of-way in each municipality that his section of the Cut-Off ran through: Knowlton, Blairstown and Frelinghuysen townships in Warren County; Green, Byram, Andover and Stanhope townships and Andover borough in Sussex County. In addition, separate corporations had been set up for the Paulinskill Viaduct and the Delaware River Viaduct, as well as for the 1.4 miles (2.3 km) of right-of-way in Pennsylvania, which was later acquired by Pennsylvania's Monroe County Railroad Authority. In addition to these corporations, Turco created holding companies to oversee these other corporations: Sussex & Warren Holding Company, Inc. and OLC, Inc., (OLC, Old Lackawanna Cut-Off). On the other hand, Goldmeier's 1 1/2-mile (2.4 km) section of right-of-way, which passed through short sections of Roxbury Township (Port Morris and Landing) in Morris County and Hopatcong Borough and Byram Township in Sussex County, was held as one parcel.

By 2001, New Jersey and Pennsylvania had acquired their respective portions of the Cut-Off for a total of $21 million.

In 2003, U.S. Senator Arlen Specter (R-PA) secured initial funding for the restoration of passenger rail service between Scranton and New York City.

In July 2006, the final environmental review was submitted to the Federal Transit Administration for review and approval. The following February, the Lackawanna County and Monroe County Railroad Authorities were merged to form the Pennsylvania Northeast Regional Railroad Authority. One of the objectives of the new rail authority was to help expedite the effort to restore passenger service on the Scranton Corridor—that is, the tracks in Pennsylvania from the former Lackawanna Cut-Off to Scranton.

== Port Morris–Andover Restoration (NJ Transit, 2008–present) ==
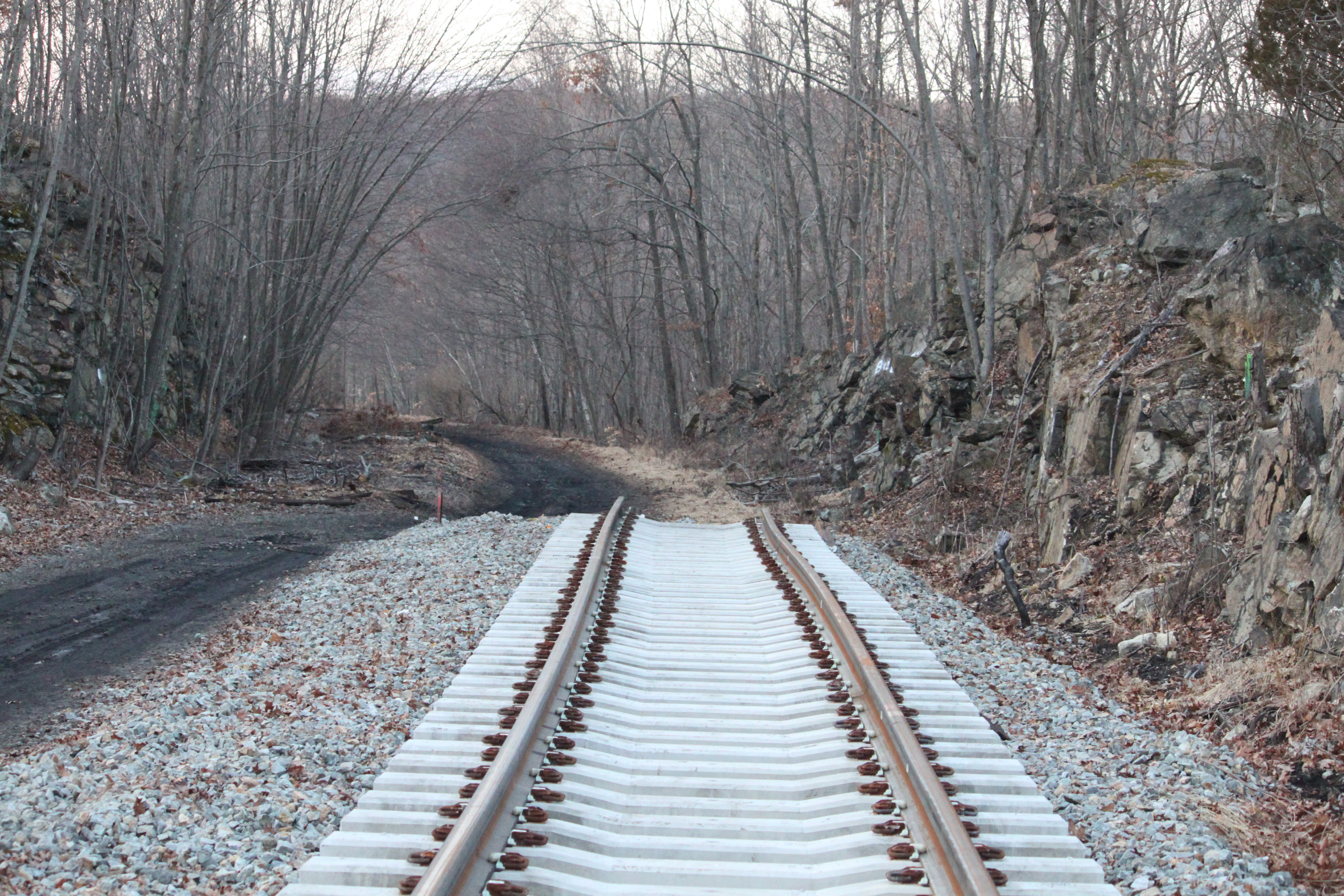
The western end of restored track near Lake Lackawanna, NJ, in February 2012.

In May 2008, the North Jersey Transportation Planning Authority (NJTPA) approved funding for Phase 1—also known as the Lackawanna Cut-Off MOS Trackbed Restoration Project, or Minimal Operating Segment, MOS—of the New Jersey Transit proposal to rebuild the first 7.3 miles (11.7 km) of the Cut-Off between Port Morris Junction and Andover.

Phase 1 would reopen one track on the once-abandoned line with a speed limit as high as 80 mph (130 km/h) for trains made up of existing NJ Transit diesel locomotives and coaches. Eight eastbound and eight westbound trains to and from Hoboken Terminal and/or New York Penn Station would run on weekdays. No weekend service is planned. Additional non-revenue trains (deadhead moves) would run in each direction to move equipment to and from Port Morris Yard.

The project would build a station on Roseville Road in Andover Township with 55 parking spaces and a 200-foot (61 m) high-level platform. Located about 1.1 miles (1.8 km) from U.S. Route 206 and about 0.9 miles (1.4 km) from Sussex County Route 517, the station site is the area's only land parcel of sufficient size that is at grade with the Cut-Off and near a major highway. No DL&W station has previously existed at Andover on the Cut-Off.

It would also include work on the Roseville Tunnel, which has seen ice buildup within and drainage problems and rockslides just west of the tunnel bore, in Colby Cut. On April 13, 2022, the New Jersey Transit Board of Directors approved a $32.5 million plan to rehabilitate the tunnel and right-of-way to its east and west.

The 2008 approval made the project eligible for Federal Transit Administration (FTA) funding for engineering and design work. By 2009, the environmental assessment for the remainder of the project to Scranton was completed, with a "Finding of No Significant Impact" (FONSI) by the U.S. Environmental Protection Agency (EPA).

Full funding for the $61.6-million Phase 1 was reiterated by the New Jersey Transit Board of Directors on July 21, 2021: a federal earmark grant of $18.1 million plus funds from FTA and the New Jersey Transportation Trust Fund (NJTTF).

=== Project status ===
The work of removing brush and general preparations to restore trackage between Port Morris and Andover got underway in early 2011, after a disagreement was resolved between the NJ-DEP and NJ Transit over the proposed location for Andover Station. (Federal regulations governing projects that receive federal funding forbid tree and brush removal from April 1 to October 31 due to the mating season of the endangered Indiana bat.) and the laying of track began from Port Morris in September 2011. Within three months, about 1 mile (1.6 km) of track had been installed west of Port Morris Junction, at which time a Norfolk Southern train delivered the remaining continuously welded rail to the Cut-Off at Port Morris, which will be used to ultimately reach Andover.

In 2013, NJ Transit began storing retired locomotives on a short section of the Cut-Off near Port Morris Junction.

In April 2015, environmental permits were issued for the non-Roseville parts of the project and NJ Transit acquired 3.53 acres of wetlands mitigation credits to compensate for the loss of wetlands in building Andover Station. No further permits are required, although NJDEP officials, citing computer models, determined that a theoretical 100-year flood required the replacement of a 219-foot (67 m) section of underground pipe that fed water from a wetlands area into Andover Junction Brook about 500 feet (150 m) upstream from Andover Station. The pipe crossed land owned by the private Hudson Farm (which is owned by IAT Reinsurance Ltd.), which had initially refused to allow the work. This stalled Phase 1.

In August 2017, a deal was reached and ratified by the New Jersey Transit Board of Directors to move the culvert away from the property. In April 2018, the Andover Township Committee announced that it had reached a tentative agreement with Hudson Farm to buy the land on which the original culvert was located; the purchase was consummated two months later for $115,000.

As of 2022, about 4 miles (6.4 km) of rail had been laid in four discontinuous sections between Port Morris and Lake Lackawanna, as described in the table below. Most of the right-of-way between Port Morris Junction and the lake has been cleared of trees and debris.

A large area of wetlands was found near County Route 605 in Stanhope/Byram/Hopatcong. There is a break in the tracks on Brooklyn Road, then the tracks stop on one side of the flooded section of the railway in Stanhope/Byram/Hopatcong and resume on the other side of the water.

Beginning in 2020, NJ Transit qualified bidders for the Roseville Tunnel Rehabilitation Project; on April 13, 2022, the agency awarded a $32.5 million contract to Secaucus-based Schiavone Construction. NJ Transit issued a Notice to Proceed on September 8, 2022, and work began that month. Work on Roseville Tunnel followed the culvert work.

NJ Transit service to Andover is projected to begin no earlier than 2026.

Section	Milepost	to Milepost	Track installed?	Work	Completion (est.)	Photo
1. Port Morris Junction	45.8	--	Yes*	Install prefabricated #12 switch at junction to replace temporary switch; install Positive Train Control (PTC) and signal system on Cut-Off; lay more track into Port Morris Yard (PMY) from Morristown Line. *Currently, a temporary connection at the junction, within Port Morris Yard limits, is installed.	2026	
1a. Port Morris Wye Track	PMY	46.4	No	Complete grading of cleared wye trackbed; more roadbed work within Port Morris Yard; lay track and reinstall signals to connect yard and mainline.	2026	
2. Port Morris Junction to Route 602	45.8	47.0	Yes	Connect wye track to mainline; align track, superelevate curve.	2026	
3. Route 602 grade crossing	47.0	47.0	No	Raise utility wires that cross the railroad right-of-way; adjust height of roadway and/or Cut-Off roadbed; install tracks across roadway with quad gates. This will be a "quiet zone": trains will not sound their horns when approaching.	2026	
4. Curve at and west of Route 602 grade crossing	47.0	47.1	No*	Minor right-of-way clearing; lay ballast and track. *Temporary track was installed on wooden ties with no ballast and later removed.	2026	
5. Tangent track west of Route 602 grade crossing (continues to start of 2nd curve west of Port Morris)	47.1	47.6	Yes	Add ballast; align track.	2026	View of new track construction by NJ Transit on Lackawanna Cut-Off in Stanhope NJ taken on March 15, 2012.
6. 2nd curve west of Port Morris (includes new and old Route 605 overhead bridges)	47.6	48.0	No	Clear right-of-way; lay ballast and track; remediate adjacent stream.	2026	
7. Section east of Lake Lackawanna (includes tangent track and 3rd and 4th curves west of Port Morris)	48.0	50.0	Yes	Track ends at Lake Lackawanna. Add ballast; align track and superelevate curves.	2026	
8. Lake Lackawanna to Roseville Tunnel (tangent track)	50.0	51.6	No	Clear right-of-way and re-lay track; rehabilitate Roseville Road underpass just east of tunnel, C-18.	2026	
9. Roseville Tunnel (tangent track)	51.6	51.8	No	Lower tunnel floor; waterproof tunnel ceiling with membrane liner; deepen drainage ditches; install lighting in tunnel; perform clearing and rockslide abatement for 1700 feet (600 m) west and 200 feet (70 m) east of tunnel; install radio system in tunnel.	2025	
10. Roseville Tunnel to Andover Station (on 5th curve west of Port Morris)	51.8	52.9	No	Clear right-of-way; improve drainage immediately west of tunnel; scale back rock wall and place rockslide protection west of tunnel; replace Roseville Road overhead bridge, C-17 (new bridge opened in 2018).	2025	
11. Andover Station	52.9	53.1	No	Replace culvert 500 feet (150 m) upstream from station on private land (2026); clear station area of trees and regrade; build parking lot and connect to nearby Roseville Road; build station building and platform; west of the station, install about 1,000 feet (300 m) of track and a switch to a siding of about the same length; install end-of-track devices; install signs at station and directional signs at nearby roads.	2026	

== Future phases ==
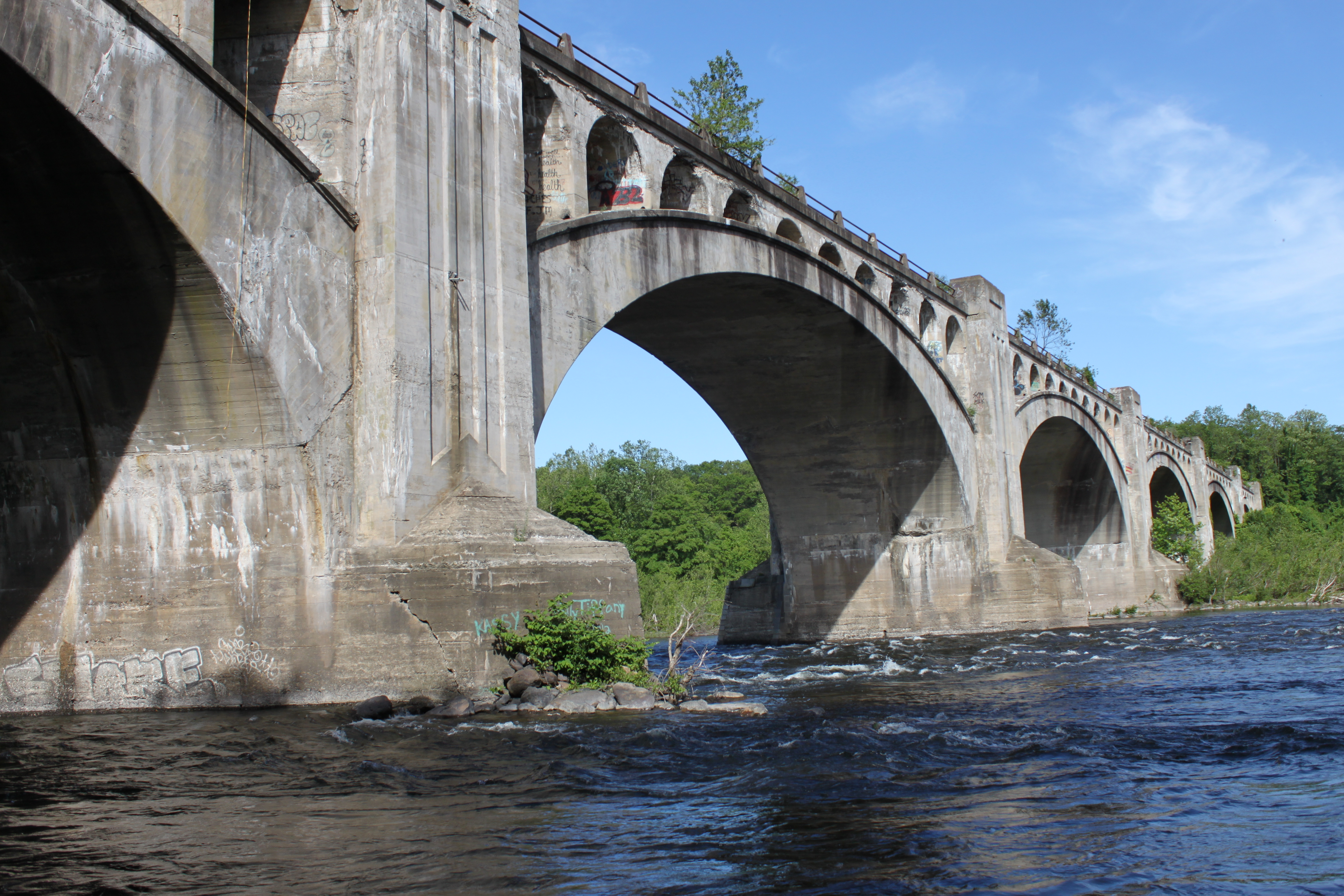
Two miles (3 km) south of the Delaware Water Gap, the Cut-Off's Delaware River Viaduct connects New Jersey and Pennsylvania

No phases have been defined beyond Phase 1 (Port Morris Junction–Andover). Proposed future phases would extend the line west of Andover to Delaware Water Gap, Scranton (88 miles (142 km) west of Port Morris), and possibly Binghamton, New York, based on funding availability.

=== New York City–Scranton (as an Amtrak project) ===
A 2020 Amtrak service expansion map, updated in May 2021, included restored service between New York and Scranton.

On March 22, 2023, Amtrak published a study of its proposal to operate passenger trains between New York Penn Station and Scranton, Pennsylvania. The service would initially provide three round-trip trains per day, estimating a 136-mile (219 km) trip time of 2 hours 50 minutes. The most significant capital costs for the project would be related to the upgrading of track in Pennsylvania; reactivating the Lackawanna Cut-Off between Andover station in Andover Township, New Jersey and Slateford Junction, Pennsylvania; and the cost of purchasing two or three Airo trainsets for Amtrak. The study noted that federal funding agencies were still choosing among various proposed rail projects but suggested that service could begin as early as 2028.

This study was initiated in July 2021 when Amtrak entered into an agreement to formally assess the infrastructure, ridership, and revenue of the route in collaboration with the Pennsylvania Northeast Regional Railroad Authority, with an approximate $400,000 cost. At that time, U.S. Representative Matt Cartwright, who represents Pennsylvania's 8th District, announced the formation of a congressional Lackawanna Cut-Off Rail Restoration Caucus focused on completing the project. The founding members were Cartwright, Susan Wild of Pennsylvania's 7th District, Mikie Sherrill of New Jersey's 11th District, and Josh Gottheimer of New Jersey's 5th District.

In October 2022, Pennsylvania awarded $3.7 million to the Monroe County Industrial Development Authority for replacing 43,000 railroad ties on 40 miles (64 km) of the line west from the Delaware Water Gap past Tobyhanna. The funds are half the required amount and allow the authority to apply for the remaining dollars from the Federal Railroad Administration (FRA). The replacement is part of track upgrades needed to allow passenger trains to travel up to 80 miles per hour (130 km/h).

In December 2023, the FRA accepted New York–Scranton into its Corridor Identification and Development Program established under the Infrastructure Investment and Jobs Act. The move allocates money for planning and prioritizes the route for future funding.

On October 29, 2024 public officials in Pennsylvania announced that $9 million in construction funding had been awarded to the Scranton-NYC Amtrak project for the replacement of the Slateford Road bridge at Slateford Junction (which had been torn down and filled-in in 1990) and for the upgrading of track to Amtrak standards west from Slateford towards Scranton.

==== Andover-Scranton (as a NJ Transit project) (Note: The Amtrak project, if it is approved by the Federal Railroad Administration, will supersede the NJ Transit project between these two points.) ====
In 2007, the estimated cost of a full build-out to Scranton was $516 million ($801,200,000 today) with an annual operating cost of $26 million. This would include track, stations, signals, and bridgework on the Cut-Off; additional stations and signals in Pennsylvania; and additional locomotives and passenger cars dedicated to the route. No estimates for building and operating any intermediate phases were made at the time.

This full build-out to Scranton would include:

- In New Jersey:
  - Rebuild the remainder of the Cut-Off (21 miles, 33 km) as a single-track railroad with a passing siding about 4 miles (6.5 km) east of Blairstown.
  - Repair the Delaware River Viaduct.
  - Repair the Paulinskill Viaduct.
  - Reopen Blairstown station with 230 parking spaces.
  - Build a maintenance facility at the former Greendell station site. (Amtrak has not yet announced its intention to use this site.)
- In Pennsylvania:
  - Replace the highway bridge at Slateford Junction (Slateford Road) that was removed in 1990.
  - Build a station near the Delaware Water Gap Visitors' Center in Smithfield Township with a 900-parking space garage.(Amtrak's proposed service does not include a station at Delaware Water Gap.)
  - Build a station in East Stroudsburg with 228 parking spaces.
  - Build a station in Analomink with 250 parking spaces. (Amtrak's proposed service does not include a station at Analomink.)
  - Build a Pocono Mountain station near the former Mount Pocono station with 1,000 parking spaces.
  - Reopen the historic station building at Tobyhanna with 102 parking spaces. (Amtrak's proposed service does not include a station at Tobyhanna.)
  - Build a station in Scranton west of the former DL&W station with 30 parking spaces and build an overnight storage and maintenance yard for trainsets, as well as a facility for train crews.
  - Upgrade the tracks in Pennsylvania to 60 or 80 mph, where applicable.
  - Install a signal system compatible with NJ Transit / Amtrak standards (including Positive Train Control).

All stations would have high-level platforms and would comply with Americans with Disabilities Act (ADA) standards. Service would be scheduled to Hoboken and New York City. By 2030, it is estimated that NJ Transit commuter service could transport 6,000 passengers a day to jobs in northern New Jersey and New York City. Amtrak performed its own ridership estimate, included in its March 23, 2023 study, which projected an annual ridership of 473,500 Amtrak passengers on the corridor, which is based on both commuter and non-commuter (recreational and tourist) passenger volumes.

=== Andover–Delaware Water Gap ===
In October 2015, a study to update the 2007 data was requested by the FTA as a prerequisite for project funding west of Andover. The "Lackawanna Cut-Off Restoration – Commuter Rail Study", released in December 2019, found that the capital costs for reactivating the railroad from Andover to a new station at Delaware Water Gap would be about $288.93 million, to cover reinstalling about 21 miles of tracks, upgrading two major bridges, and other related work. The figure is roughly half the 2006 estimate of $551 million, largely because it excluded 55 miles (88.7 km) of railroad between the Delaware Water Gap and Scranton.

The 2019 study cost about $1 million, funded by local, state, and federal grants assembled by the office of U.S. Representative Matt Cartwright. It was prepared by Greenman-Pederson, Inc. of Scranton, PA (supported by sub-consultant Gannett-Fleming, Inc.) for the Pennsylvania Northeast Regional Railroad Authority and the Lackawanna County Department of Planning and Economic Development.

The scope of work included: assessments of the condition of the Paulinskill and Delaware River Viaducts; conceptual evaluation of a rail station and parking garage layout at Delaware Water Gap; a desk-top assessment of track geometry and rail operating speeds along the corridor; desk-top assessment of signaling and Positive Train Control needs in the corridor; assessments of the existing track, drainage and railroad bed condition in the corridor; conceptual layout of a bridge to carry Slateford Road over the restored passenger line; underwater inspection of the three river piers of the Delaware River Viaduct; and conceptual and updated cost estimates for the anticipated improvements.

The total conceptual construction costs for the project were preliminarily estimated to be $288,930,000. The individual cost elements were broken down as follows: Water Gap Rail Station ($32,630,000); right-of-way acquisition at the Delaware Water Gap Station ($1,500,000); Slateford Road Overhead Bridge construction and nearby culvert repairs ($3,320,000); signals and Positive Train Control ($8,190,000); track restoration in Pennsylvania (Delaware River Viaduct to Slateford Junction) ($16,610,000); track Restoration in New Jersey (Andover to Delaware River Viaduct) ($112,600,000); Delaware River Viaduct Rehabilitation ($54,000,000); Paulinskill Viaduct Rehabilitation ($16,000,000); and design, environmental and engineering costs ($44,080,000). The source of the funding for this scenario was never identified. With Amtrak's current involvement with the project between Scranton and New York City, the cost estimates determined within this study could be used as a guide for future cost estimates.

=== Scranton–Binghamton (and Beyond) ===
In December 2008, U.S. Senator Chuck Schumer, Democrat of New York, sent a letter to Amtrak president Joseph Boardman, expressing his support for Amtrak service between Scranton, Binghamton, New York and Syracuse, New York. In April 2009, U.S. Senators Arlen Specter and Bob Casey, Jr., Democrats of Pennsylvania, sent a joint letter to President Barack Obama, seeking support for the extension of Amtrak service to the region. They also cited an Amtrak feasibility study on the subject.

== Stations and landmarks (Port Morris–Scranton) ==
mi* (km)	Town	Station/Landmark	Coordinates	Notes
45.8 (73.7)	Roxbury Township	Port Morris Junction	40.907820°N 74.669852°W	Junction between Lackawanna Cut-Off and Montclair-Boonton Line to Hoboken Terminal and Penn Station in Midtown Manhattan (via Midtown Direct service). Nearest station: Lake Hopatcong, milepost 45.5. NJT's Port Morris railyard is also here. (Morris Canal passed under the Cut-Off just west of yard tower until it was filled in by the mid-1920s).
51.6 (83.0)	Byram Township	Roseville Tunnel	40.971043°N 74.710550°W	1,000-foot (300 m) double-track tunnel under rehabilitation by NJ Transit.
53 (85)	Andover Township	Andover	40.981389°N 74.730278°W	Planned NJT station.
57.6 (92.7)	Green Township	Greendell	40.975305°N 74.81892°W	Proposed NJ Transit maintenance facility on Cut-Off. Station and tower closed in 1938. Amtrak has not announced whether it would intend to use the station area at Greendell.
60.7 (97.7)	Frelinghuysen Township	Johnsonburg	40.97044°N 74.877417°W	DL&W station closed 1940; partially rebuilt in early 1990s; demolished in 2007.
64.8 (104.3)	Blairstown Township	Blairstown	40.9682°N 74.953783°W	Proposed NJT station, possibly using existing station building, which is now privately owned. The only regularly scheduled stop for DL&W/EL passenger trains on the Cut-Off.
71.6 (115.2)	Knowlton Township	Paulinskill Viaduct	40.9480°N 75.0613°W	Also called Hainesburg Viaduct.
73 (117)	Stateline (NJ/PA)(Delaware River)	Delaware River Viaduct	40.9376°N 75.1057°W	I-80 passes under viaduct on New Jersey side of the river.
74.3 (119.6)	Slateford	Slateford Junction	40.9500°N 75.1160°W	Junction between Lackawanna Cut-Off and Old Road. Interlocking tower.
77.2 (124.2)	Delaware Water Gap	Delaware Water Gap	40.991667°N 75.140278°W	Proposed station about 1/2 mile (800 m) west of station vacated in 1967. Amtrak is not proposing a station stop at Delaware Water Gap.
81.6 (131.3)	East Stroudsburg	East Stroudsburg	40.998889°N 75.181944°W	Proposed station, south of old station site.
86.8 (139.7)	Analomink	Analomink	41.0405°N 75.2124°W	Proposed station. Amtrak is not proposing a station stop at Analomink.
100.3 (161.4)	Mount Pocono	Pocono Mountain	41.1175°N 75.3545°W	Proposed station north of former station in Coolbaugh Township near PA 611.
107.6 (173.2)	Tobyhanna	Tobyhanna	41.1795°N 75.4182°W	Originally a station stop proposed by Amtrak, but subsequently was dropped from consideration by Amtrak. Station building, closed in January 1958, is currently used for historic purposes.
133.1 (214.2)	Scranton	Scranton	41.4103°N 75.6721°W	Proposed station southwest of old station and DL&W regional headquarters building, now a Radisson Hotel. Former station stops at Gouldsboro and Moscow, between Tobyhanna and Scranton, are not proposed as station stops for this service at present.

(* Miles from Hoboken, NJ.)
