= Tobyhanna station =

Tobyhanna
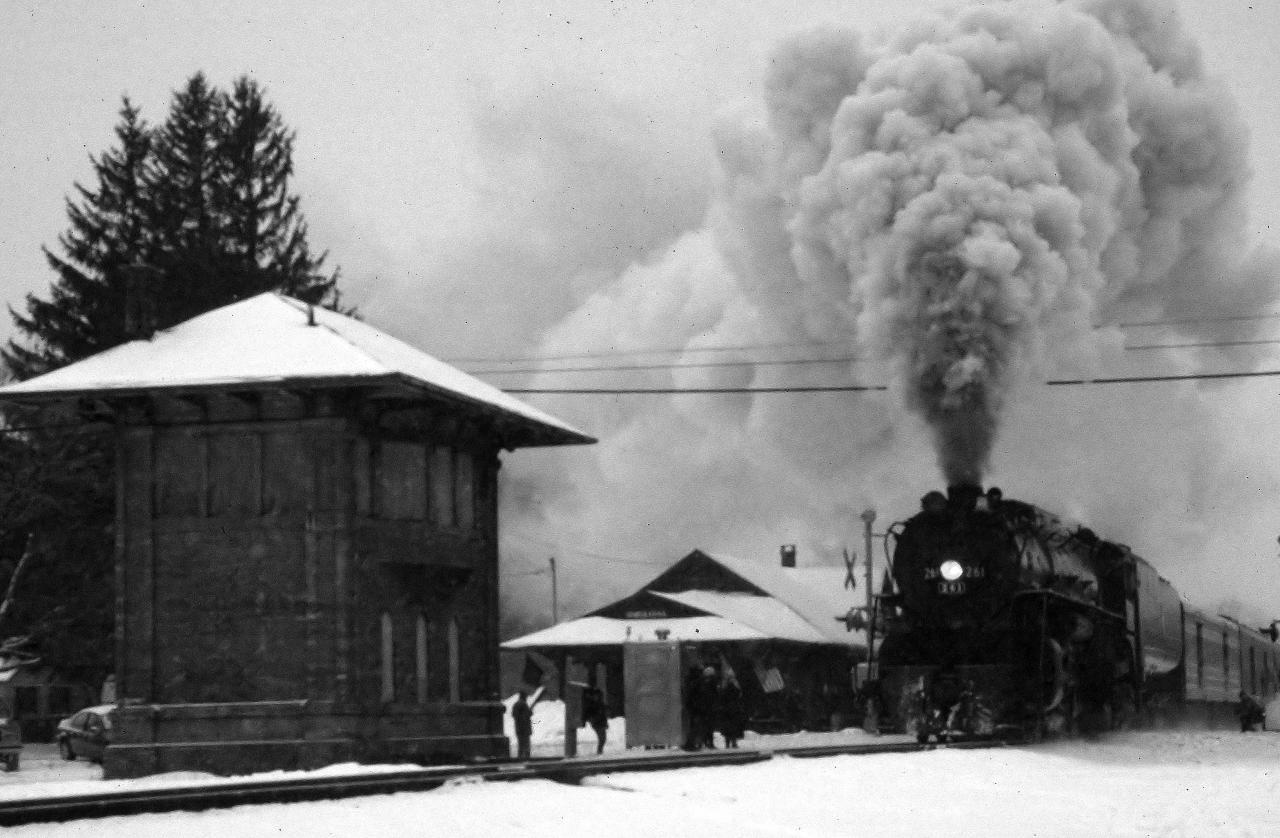
- Milwaukee Road 261 at Tobyhanna in 1996

General information
- Location: Church Street (PA 423) at Godwin Street, Tobyhanna, Pennsylvania
- Coordinates: 41°10′46″N 75°25′06″W
- Owner: Pennsylvania Northeast Regional Railroad Authority
- Line: Pocono Mainline

Construction
- Parking: 102 spaces (proposed)

Other information
- Station code: 108 (D&LW)

History
- Opened: 1908
- Closed: 1965
- Rebuilt: 1994; 2005

Former and proposed services
| Preceding station | Delaware, Lackawanna and Western Railroad | Following station |
|---|---|---|
| Scranton toward Buffalo | Main Line | Mount Pocono toward Hoboken |
| Gouldsboro toward Buffalo | Main Line | Pocono Summit toward Hoboken |
Proposed services
| Preceding station | NJ Transit | Following station |
| Scranton Terminus | Lackawanna Cut-Off | Pocono Mountain toward New York or Hoboken |
Location

Tobyhanna station is a proposed NJ Transit commuter rail station that is located in Coolbaugh Township, Monroe County, Pennsylvania in the United States. The station forms part of a site owned by a number of public and private entities including the Pennsylvania Northeast Regional Railroad Authority.

Its site is adjacent to the former Delaware, Lackawanna and Western Railroad (and later, Erie Lackawanna) station. The building remains in place and is in use as the local historical society rail museum.

In spring 2021, Amtrak announced plans to establish a New York-Scranton route.

== History ==
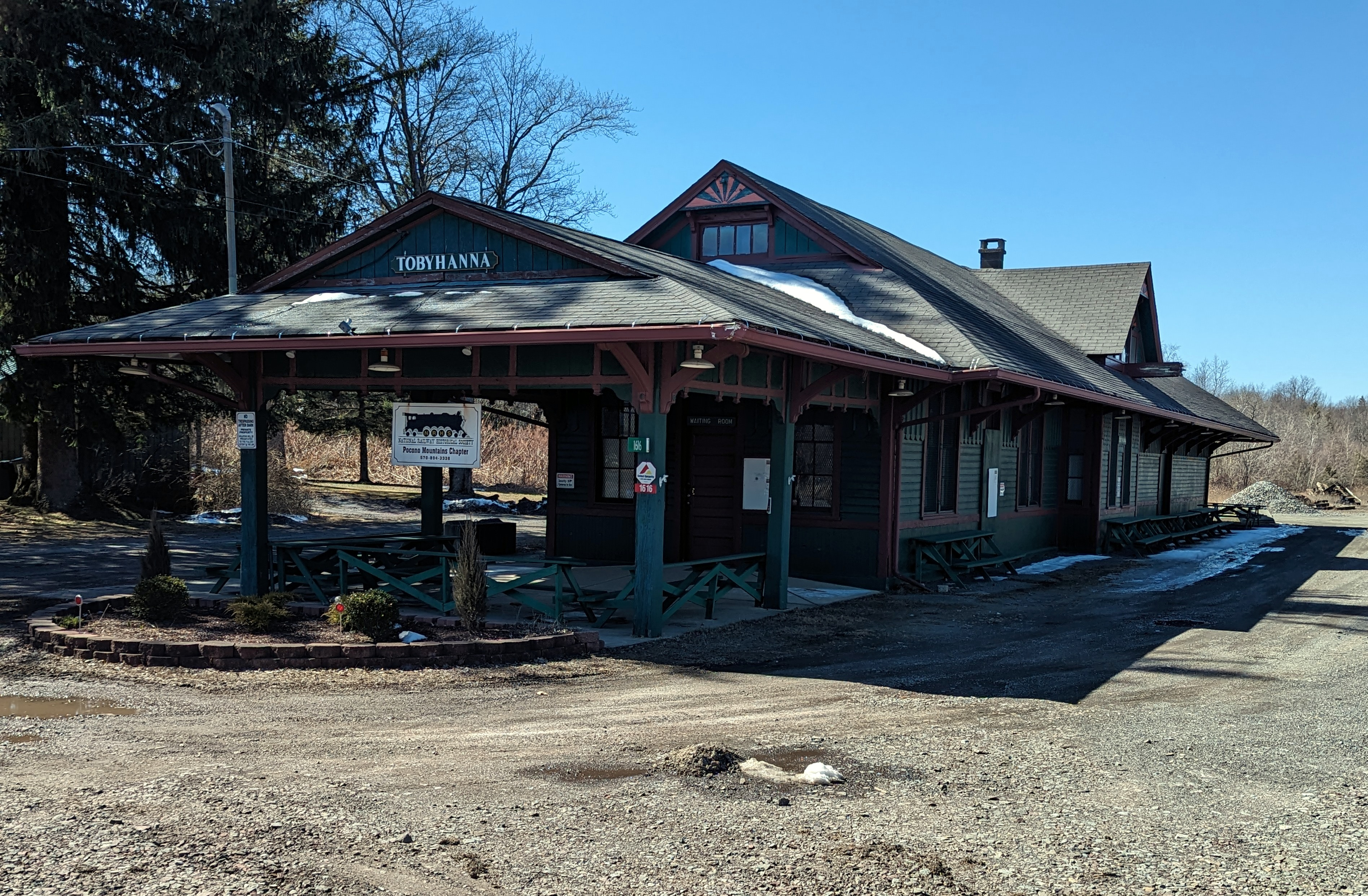
The station building in 2023

Until 1947, Tobyhanna was a flagstop that was eastbound on Sundays for the Lackawanna Limited, the predecessor to the Phoebe Snow.

Through the end of the 1950s, a few trains made station stops in Tobyhanna. In 1959, these trains were the westbound Scrantonian, which traveled to Scranton, the Twilight, a late afternoon train bound for Buffalo, and an unnamed train that also traveled to Scranton. Eastbound, service that year consisted of the Pocono Express from Buffalo, the Merchants Express from Scranton and an unnamed evening train from Scranton.

Service in the last years was limited to the Twilight and the Poconos Express with the trains terminating or originating at Scranton. Passenger service ended with the discontinuation of these trains in the fall of 1965.

Restoration of passenger service has been proposed for the Lackawanna Cut-Off, offering trains to northern New Jersey and New York City. A 102-space surface parking lot has also been proposed at this location to be situated on the vacant side and rear portions of this site. The proposed platform would be to the south of the track, north of Church Street.
