= Delaware Water Gap station =

Delaware Water Gap

General information
- Location: River Road, Smithfield Township, Pennsylvania
- Coordinates: 40°59′30″N 75°8′25″W
- Owner: Pennsylvania Department of Transportation
- Line: Pocono Mainline

Construction
- Parking: 900 spaces (proposed)

Proposed services
Preceding station	NJ Transit	Following station
East Stroudsburg toward Scranton	Lackawanna Cut-Off	Blairstown toward New York or Hoboken
Location

The Delaware Water Gap is a proposed rail station in Smithfield Township, Monroe County, Pennsylvania, as part of the Lackawanna Cut-Off Restoration Project. The new station would be built south of PA Route 2028 (River Road), about 1 mile (1.6 km) west of the historic railroad station of the same name. Passenger rail service into New Jersey and New York City would be provided by NJ Transit or Amtrak via the Lackawanna Cut-Off.

Parking would be available at the Pennsylvania welcome center, located southwest of Interstate 80. The Commonwealth of Pennsylvania recently completed improvements to the welcome center. A park-and-ride facility, a five-level garage with about 900 spaces, would be built in the current parking area. The amount of parking for the welcome center would remain unchanged.

Pedestrians would walk between the station platform, located between the track and Interstate 80, and the parking site via River Road (Route 2028), which would be improved to handle the foot traffic. Cars coming from Interstate 80 would also use River Road.

The proposed location is just outside Delaware Water Gap National Recreation Area.

== See also ==
- Lackawanna Cut-Off
