= Pocono Mountain station =

Proposed New Jersey train station

Pocono Mountain
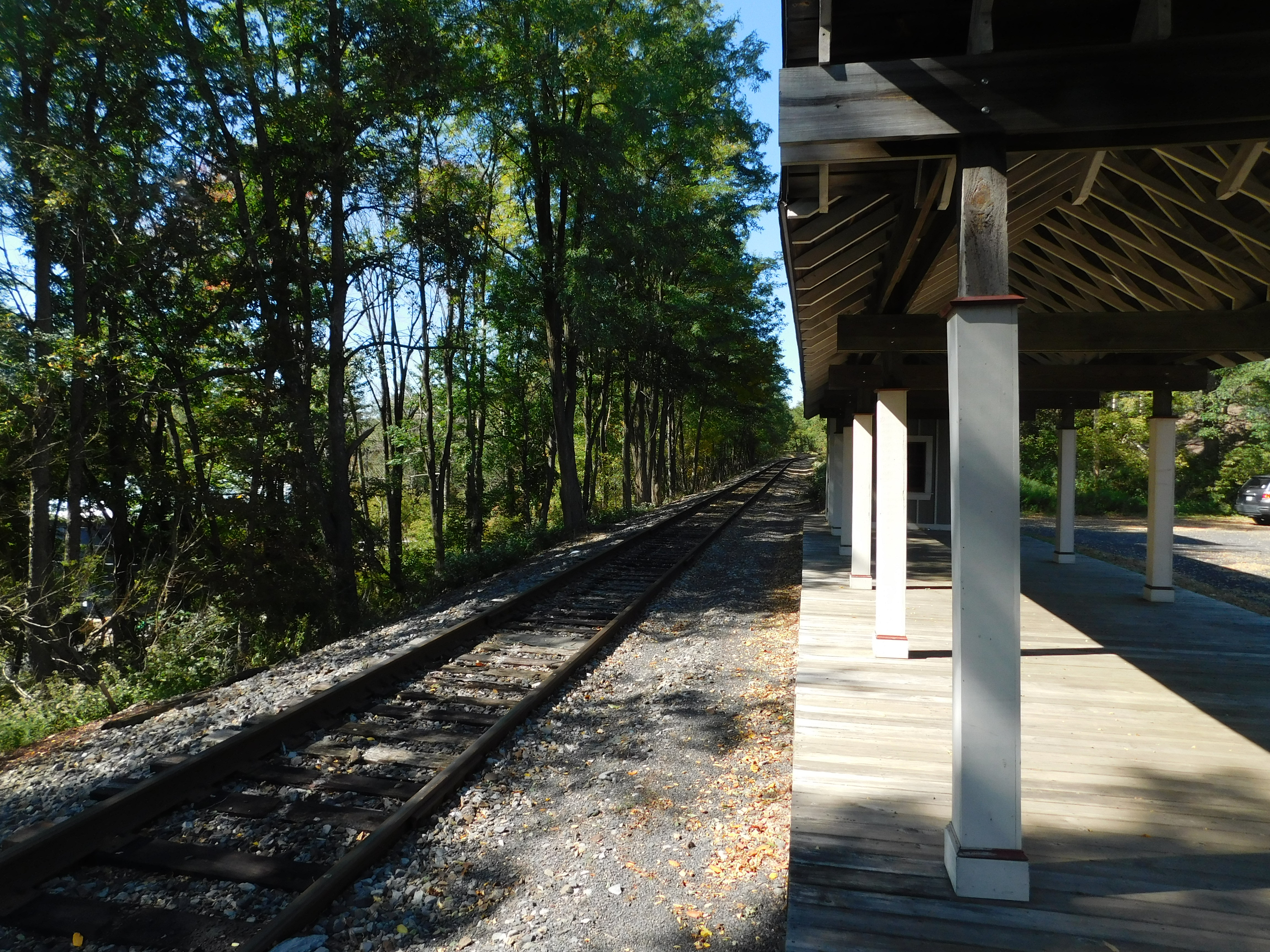
- The station site of Mount Pocono station in October 2020.

General information
- Location: Route 611, Coolbaugh Township, Pennsylvania
- Coordinates: 41°07′03″N 75°21′16″W
- Owner: Privately owned
- Line: Pocono Mainline

Construction
- Parking: 1,000 spaces (proposed)

Former and proposed services
Preceding station	Delaware, Lackawanna and Western Railroad	Following station
Tobyhanna toward Buffalo	Main Line	Analomink toward Hoboken
Pocono Summit toward Buffalo	Main Line	Cresco toward Hoboken
Proposed services
Preceding station	NJ Transit	Following station
Tobyhanna toward Scranton	Lackawanna Cut-Off	Analomink toward New York or Hoboken
Location

Pocono Mountain is a proposed New Jersey Transit Rail Operations (NJT) station located in Coolbaugh Township, Monroe County, Pennsylvania and is part of a site that was formerly utilized as a summer camp. The proposed station site, which will include a 1,000-space surface parking lot, is located northwest of a multi-phased planned development for this area. Access will be from Pennsylvania Route 611 via Pocono Municipal Road/Mount Pocono Road and a local access road and the platform would be situated east of the track.

Rail service from this station to New Jersey and New York City would be provided by NJ Transit if Lackawanna Cut-Off Restoration Project is completed. In spring 2021, Amtrak announced plans for potential New York-Scranton route.

== Background ==
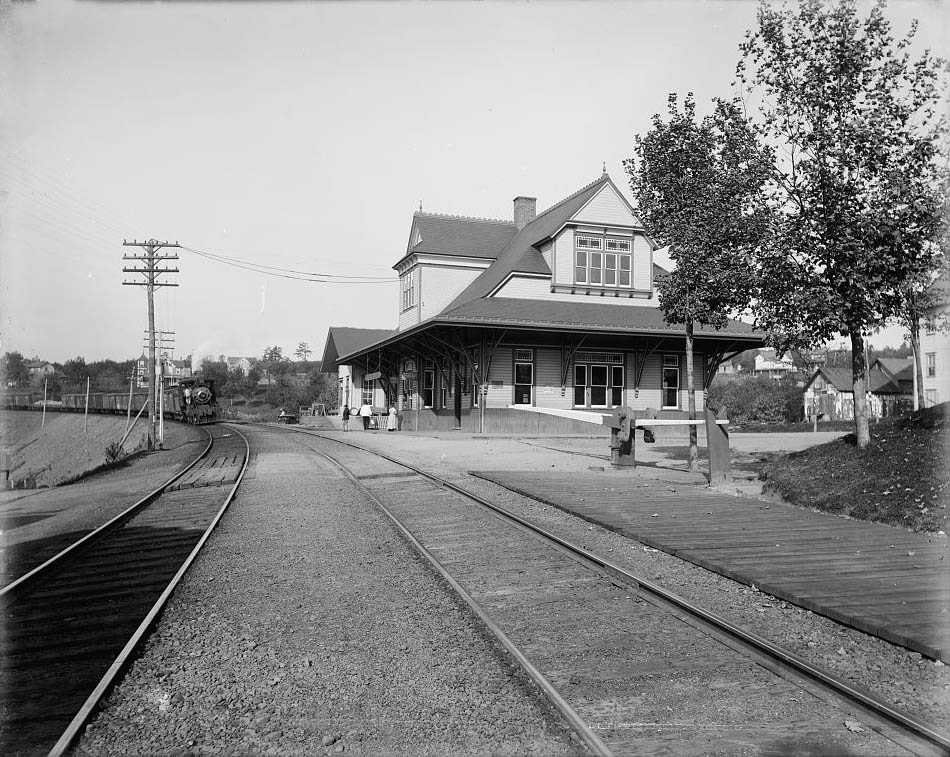
Mt. Pocono DL&W station, ca. 1895

The main line of the Delaware, Lackawanna and Western Railroad (DL&W) and, farther east, the Lackawanna Cut-Off in New Jersey passed through the southern end of the borough of Mount Pocono and continued to Hoboken Terminal. A passenger station was originally built at the crossing of what is now Pennsylvania Route 611 in 1886. Most of the station was demolished in 1937 when the highway was widened. Year-round passenger service to the station had ceased in 1956. Thereafter, trains would only stop at the station during summer months. The final years of summer service on the merged Erie Lackawanna Railroad were for the Twilight (Hoboken to Scranton) and the Pocono Express (Scranton to Hoboken), with the last summer being 1965. The disappearance of these trains from the timetable later in the year marked the end for service at this station.

The former DL&W tracks now carry freight trains for the Delaware Lackawanna Railroad and an occasional excursion train from Steamtown National Historic Site.

However, service in adjacent Pocono Summit on the Erie Lackawanna's Lake Cities (Hoboken-Scranton-Binghamton-Chicago) in the west-bound direction continued to January 5, 1970. Nearby Cresco saw Lake Cities service in both the westbound and eastbound service.
