= Analomink station =

Analomink

General information
- Location: Route 191, Stroud Township, Pennsylvania
- Coordinates: 41°02′26″N 75°12′45″W
- Owner: Pennsylvania Department of Transportation and Stroud Township
- Line: Pocono Mainline

Construction
- Parking: 250 spaces (proposed)

Other information
- Station code: 86 (D&LW)

Former and proposed services
| Preceding station | Delaware, Lackawanna and Western Railroad | Following station |
|---|---|---|
| Mount Pocono toward Buffalo | Main Line | East Stroudsburg toward Hoboken |
| Henryville toward Buffalo | Main Line | East Stroudsburg toward Hoboken |
Proposed services
| Preceding station | NJ Transit | Following station |
| Pocono Mountain toward Scranton | Lackawanna Cut-Off | East Stroudsburg toward New York or Hoboken |
Location

Analomink is a former Delaware, Lackawanna and Western Railroad station along PA Route 191 in Analomink, Stroud Township, Pennsylvania. PennDOT and Stroud Township own the two parcels that comprise the proposed site, which would be serviced by New Jersey Transit. While the Township-owned portion is currently vacant, the parcel under PennDOT ownership is used for roadway maintenance materials storage.

== History ==
This station and the next station, Henryville, were the two stations northwest from the East Stroudsburg station to the Cresco station. By the late 1930s Analomink served just a few local trains DLW a day, with the noteworthy named trains bypassing the station. The station stopped seeing passenger service at some point between 1939 and 1946.

== Prospective return of service ==
The station site will be situated between the track and Route 191, and would include a 250-space surface parking lot. Access to this site will be from Routes 191 and 447.

Rail service to New Jersey and New York City would be provided by NJ Transit via the Lackawanna Cut-Off.
