= Grueby Faience Company =

American ceramics company (1894–1920)

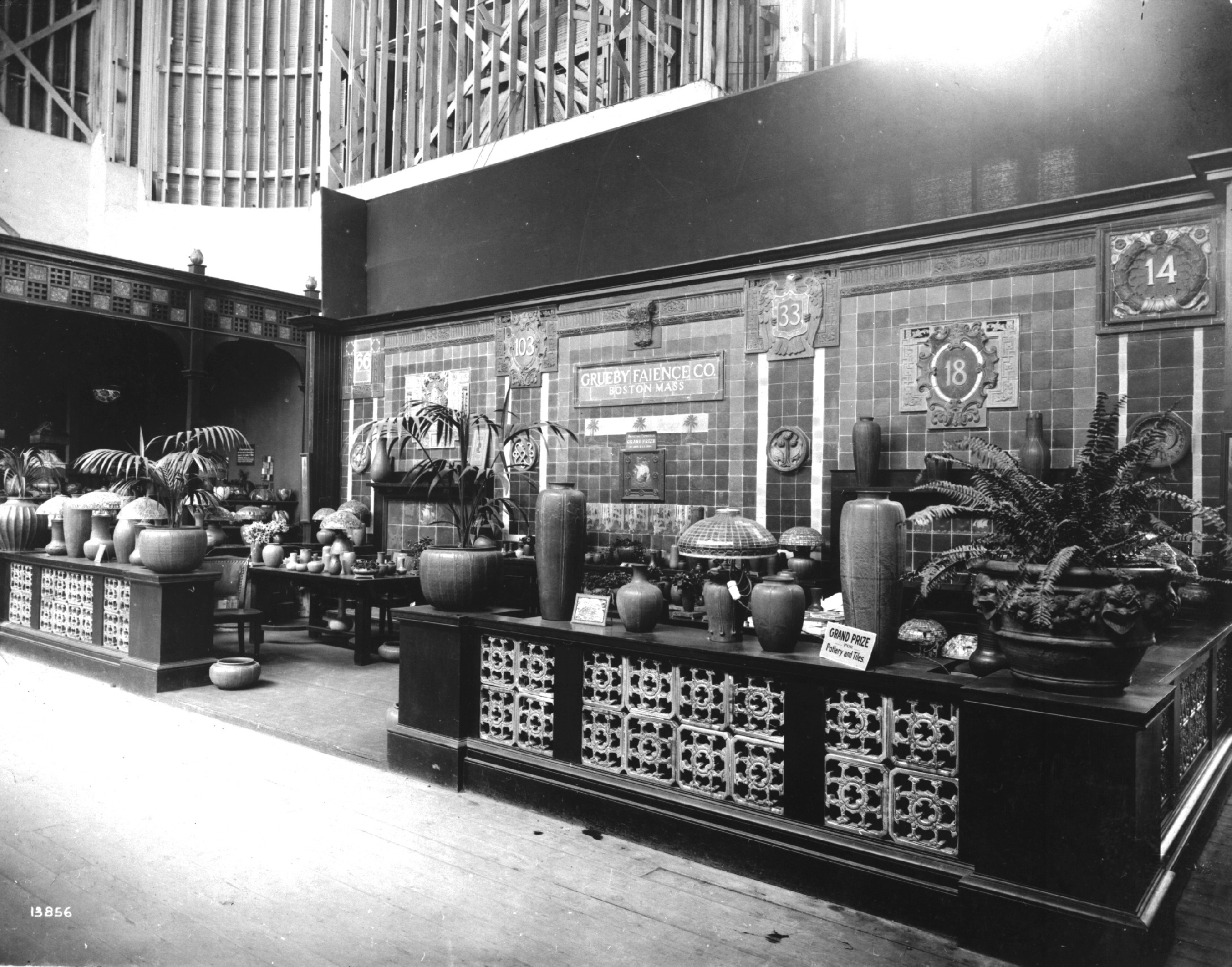
- The Grueby Faience Company's exhibit at the 1904 World's Fair
- Industry: Clay industry
- Founded: 1894
- Founder: William Henry Grueby
- Defunct: 1920
- Fate: Dissolved
- Headquarters: Revere, Massachusetts, United States

The Grueby Faience Company was an American ceramic company that produced distinctive American art pottery vases and tiles during America's Arts and Crafts Movement.

== History ==
In 1894 the company was founded in Revere, Massachusetts, by William Henry Grueby (Boston, 1867—New York, 1925) and the architect-designer William Graves. Grueby had been inspired by the matte glazes on French pottery and the refined simplicity of Japanese ceramics he had seen at the World's Columbian Exposition in Chicago. During its first years, the company produced glazed architectural terra cotta and faience tiles. The company initially focused on simple art pottery vases designed by George Prentiss Kendrick. Beginning in 1897 and 1898, Grueby introduced matte glazes, including the matte cucumber green that became the company's hallmark.

Grueby's work won two gold medals and one silver medal at the 1900 Exposition Universelle in Paris; medals at the 1901 Pan-American Exposition in Buffalo, New York; and a gold medal at both the 1901 St. Petersburg Exhibition of Ceramics and the 1904 Louisiana Purchase Exposition in St. Louis.

The company stood in the mainstream of Arts and Crafts and Art Nouveau design in the United States. Graves and Kendrick were eventually replaced by the architect Addison LeBoutillier and Henry Belknap, who had worked with Louis Comfort Tiffany. Later Karl Langenbeck, formerly of the Rookwood Pottery, would oversee design. Soon Grueby vases were for sale at Samuel Bing's shop in Paris, L'Art Nouveau, which gave a name to the progressive art movement, and through Tiffany & Co. in New York, where Tiffany Studios used Grueby lamp bases. Gustav Stickley incorporated Grueby tiles in his stands and tables, shared a stand with Grueby at the Pan-American Exposition, and through his catalog offered Grueby vases and lamps.

In addition to art pottery, the company also produced glazed architectural tiles from molds. Their polychrome glazed tiles can still be seen in the revetments of Interborough Rapid Transit Company subway stations in New York and thirty-six original tile murals in the main lobby of Scranton's Lackawanna Train Station.

Grueby's work incited mass-market competition and the company went bankrupt in 1909. Grueby emerged from bankruptcy and began limited production runs that included statues, pottery, and tiles until 1911. There was a fire in the manufactory in 1913, but Grueby rebuilt. In 1917, the C. Pardee Works in Perth Amboy, New Jersey, bought out the company's assets, closing the Grueby company for good in 1920.

== Legacy ==
The standard monograph is Susan J. Montgomery, The Ceramics of William H. Grueby: The Spirit of New Idea in Artistic Handicraft, 1993. The collection at Dartmouth College is catalogued by Montgomery, Grueby Pottery: A New England Arts and Crafts Venture : The William Curry Collection, Hood Museum of Art, Dartmouth College, 1994.

== Gallery ==
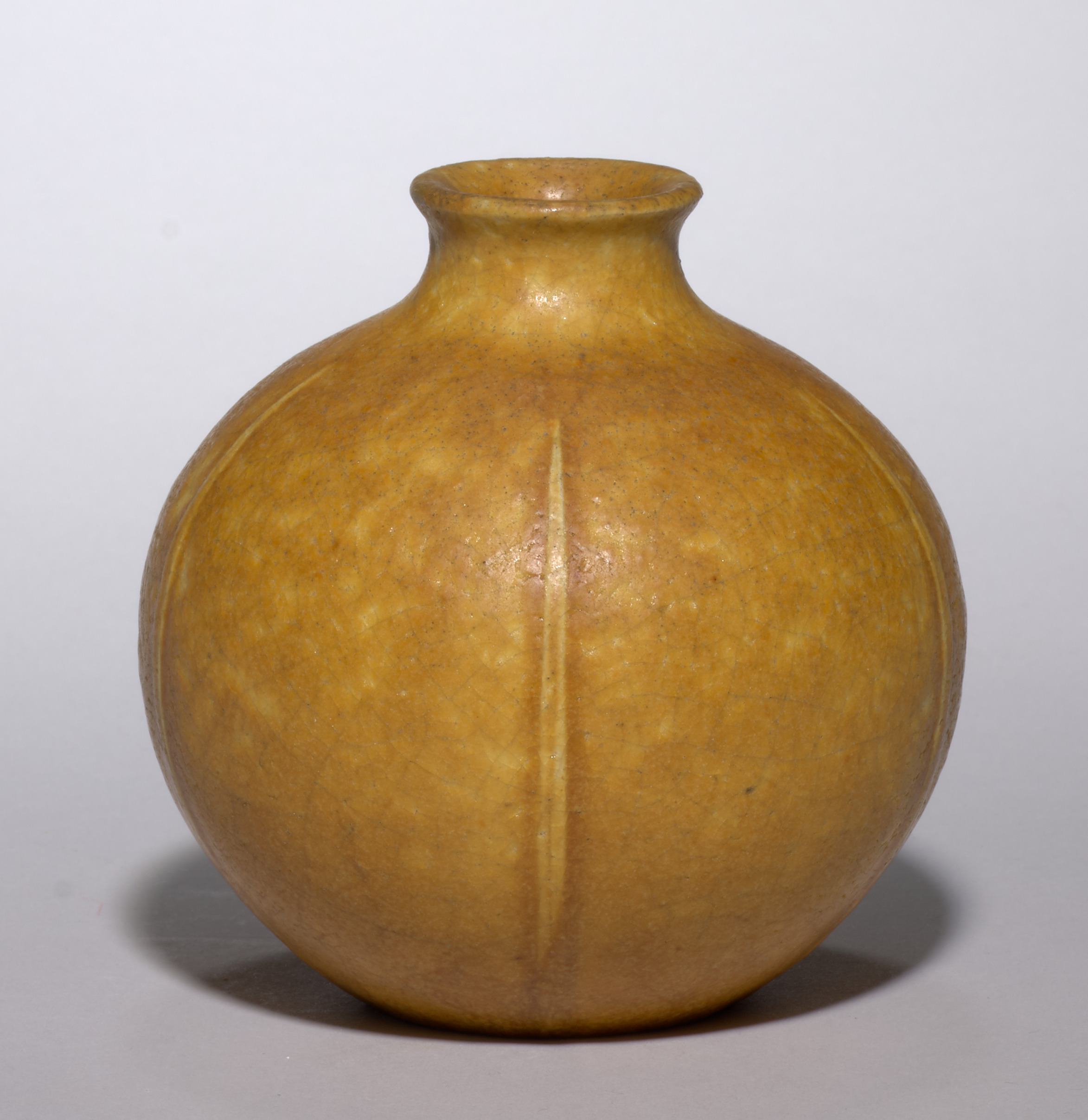
Grueby vase from the collection of the Cleveland Museum of Art

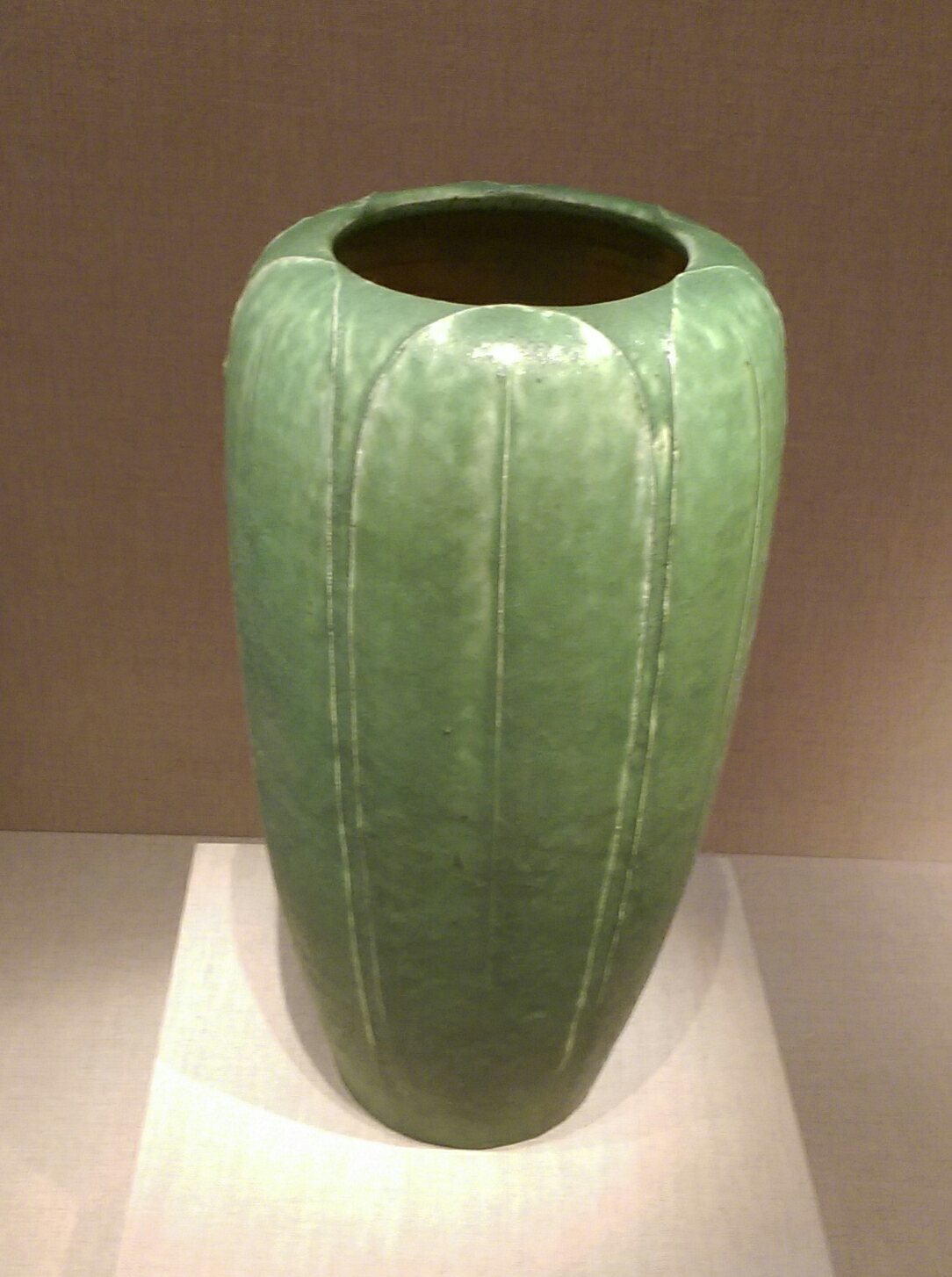
A Grueby Faience vase by Wilhelmina Post, made around 1910

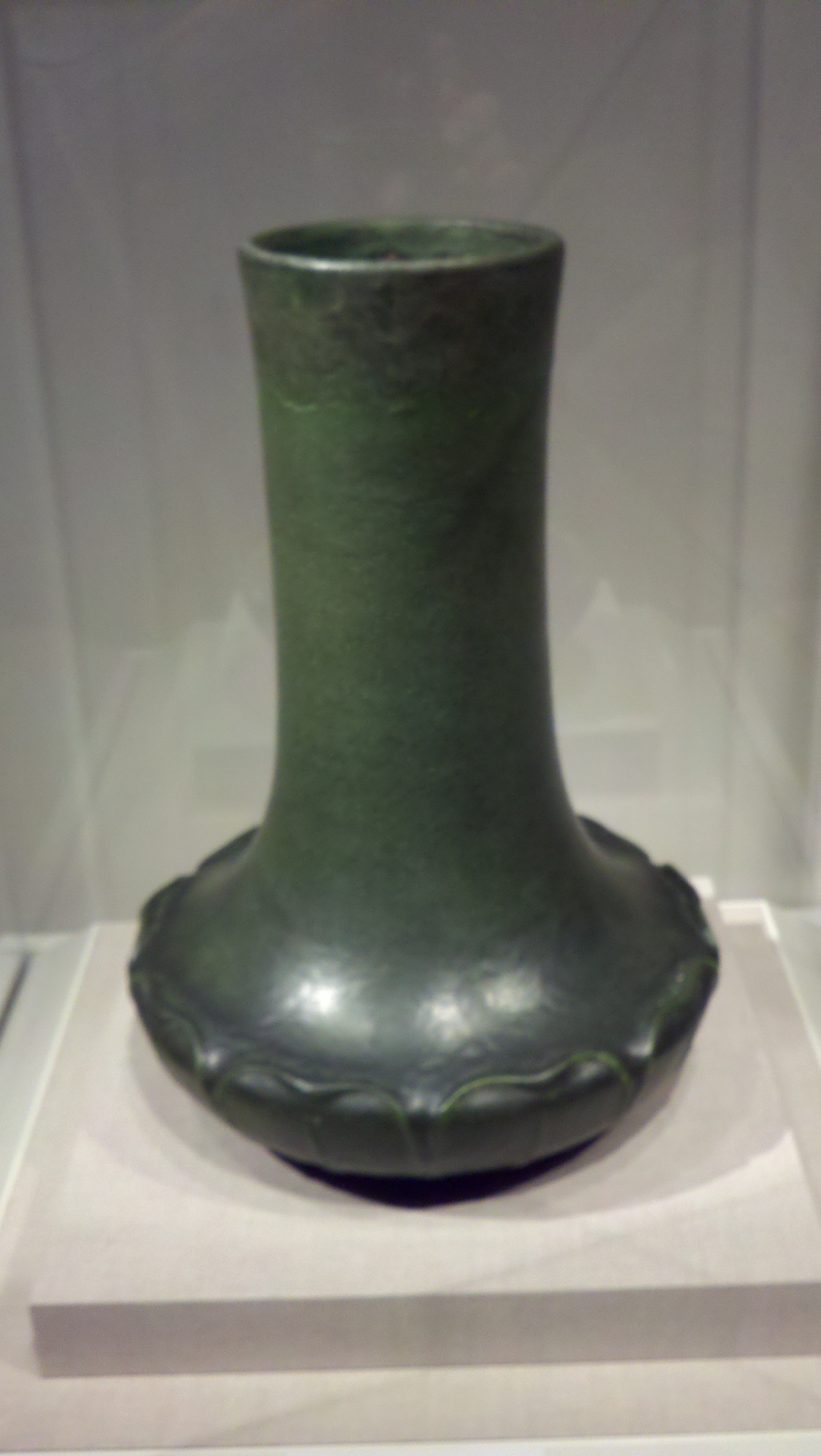
A 1906 Grueby Faience vase

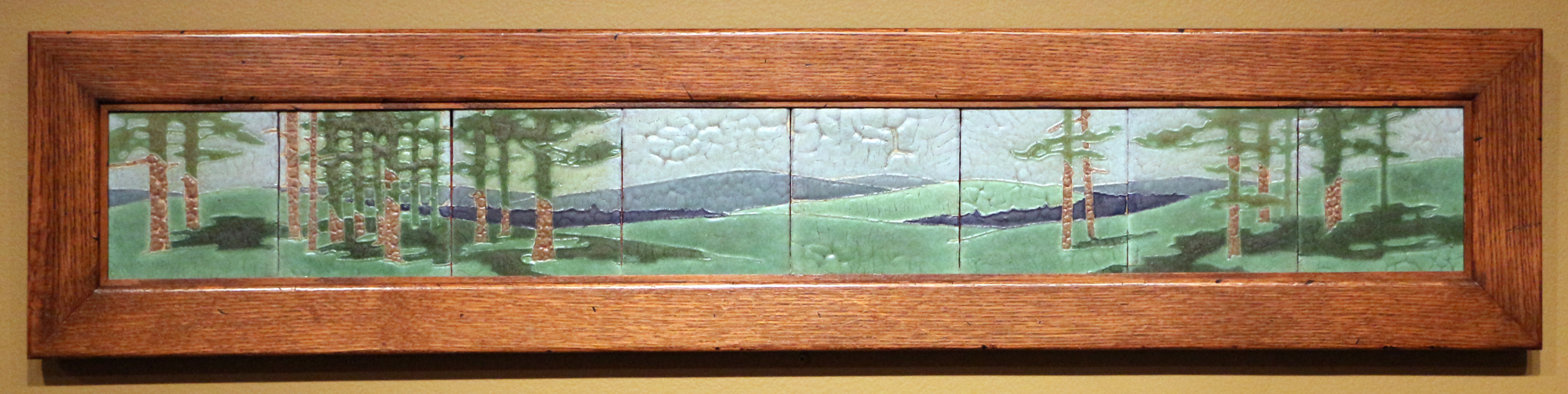
A 1906 Grueby tile mural at the Art Institute of Chicago

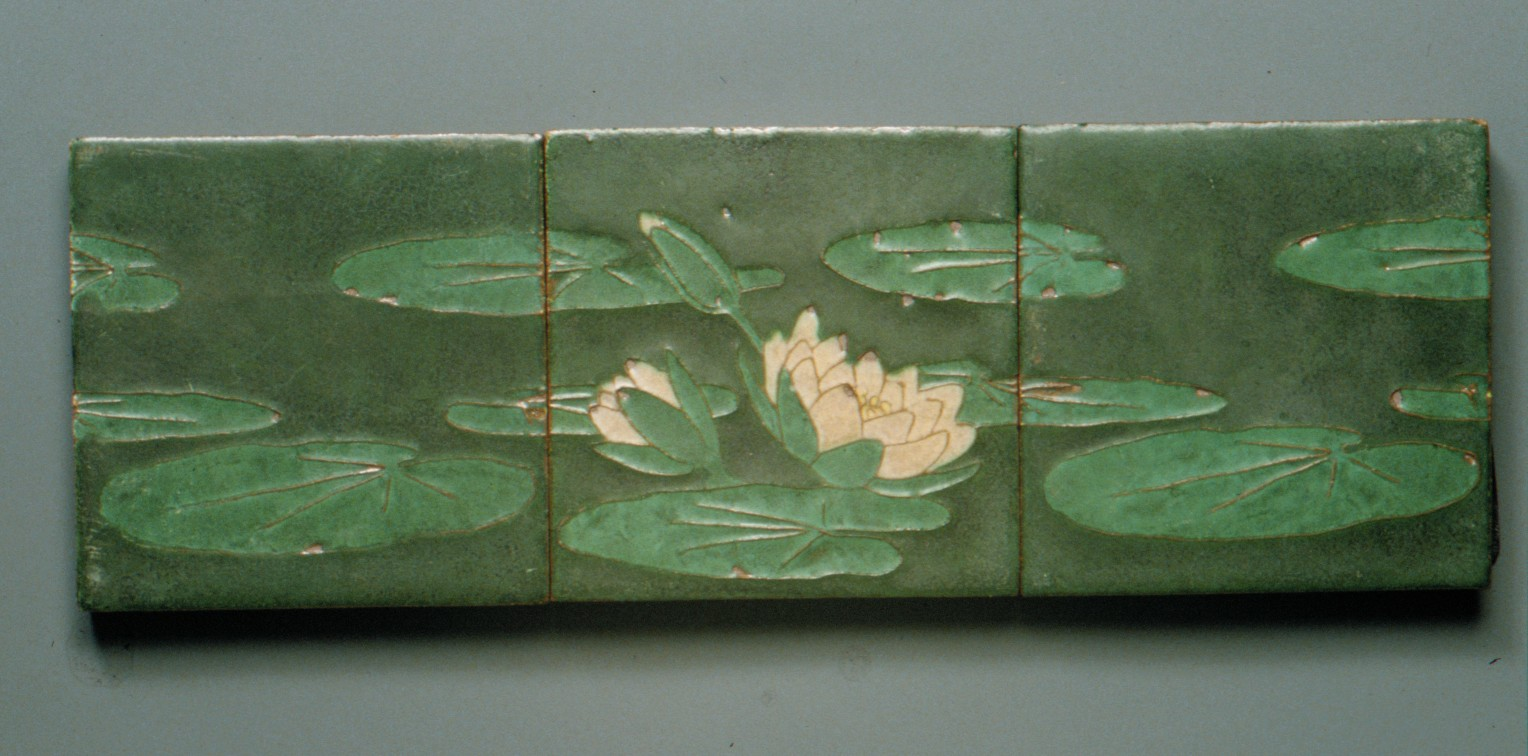
Lilypad tile mural produced by Grueby

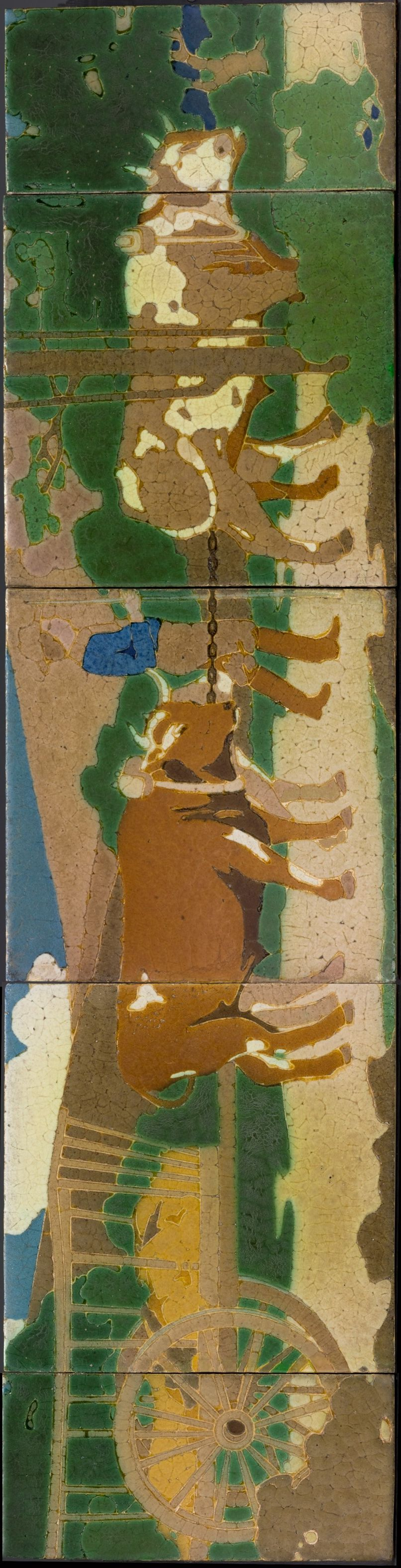
Oxen frieze designed by Addison B Le Boutellier for Grueby
