= Radisson Lackawanna Station Hotel =

Building on Pennsylvania, US

Scranton
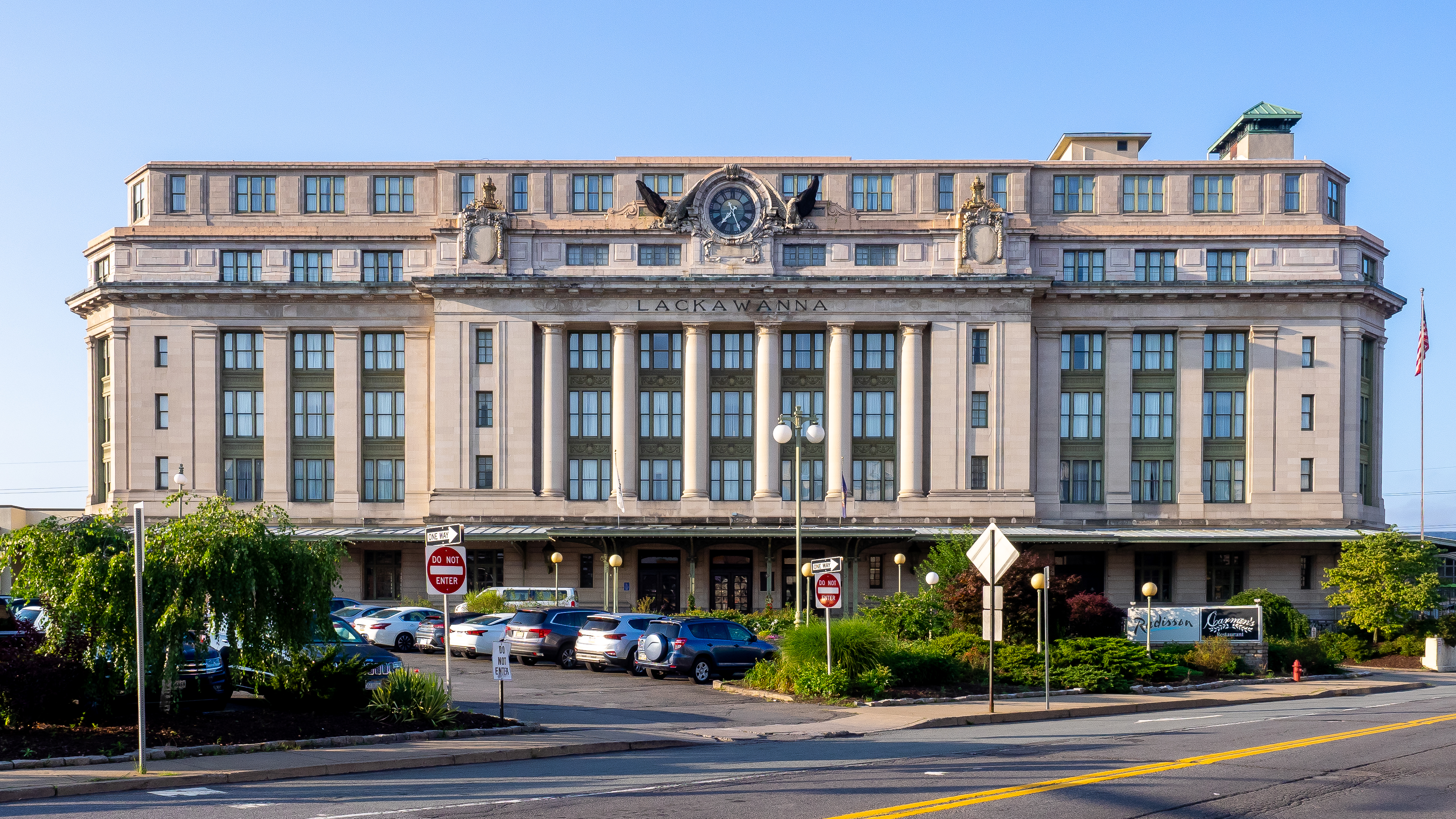
- The front of the ex DL&W Station, now a hotel on August 4, 2019

General information
- Line: Delaware, Lackawanna and Western Railroad
- Platforms: 1 side platform, 1 island platform
- Tracks: 4

Construction
- Architectural style: Delaware, Lackawanna and Western Railroad

History
- Opened: 1908
- Closed: January 6, 1970
- Rebuilt: 1923

Former services
Preceding station	Delaware, Lackawanna and Western Railroad	Following station
Binghamton toward Buffalo	Main Line	Tobyhanna toward Hoboken
Clarks Summit toward Buffalo	Main Line	Moscow toward Hoboken
Old Forge toward Northumberland	Northumberland – Scranton	Terminus
Location

Radisson Lackawanna Station Hotel
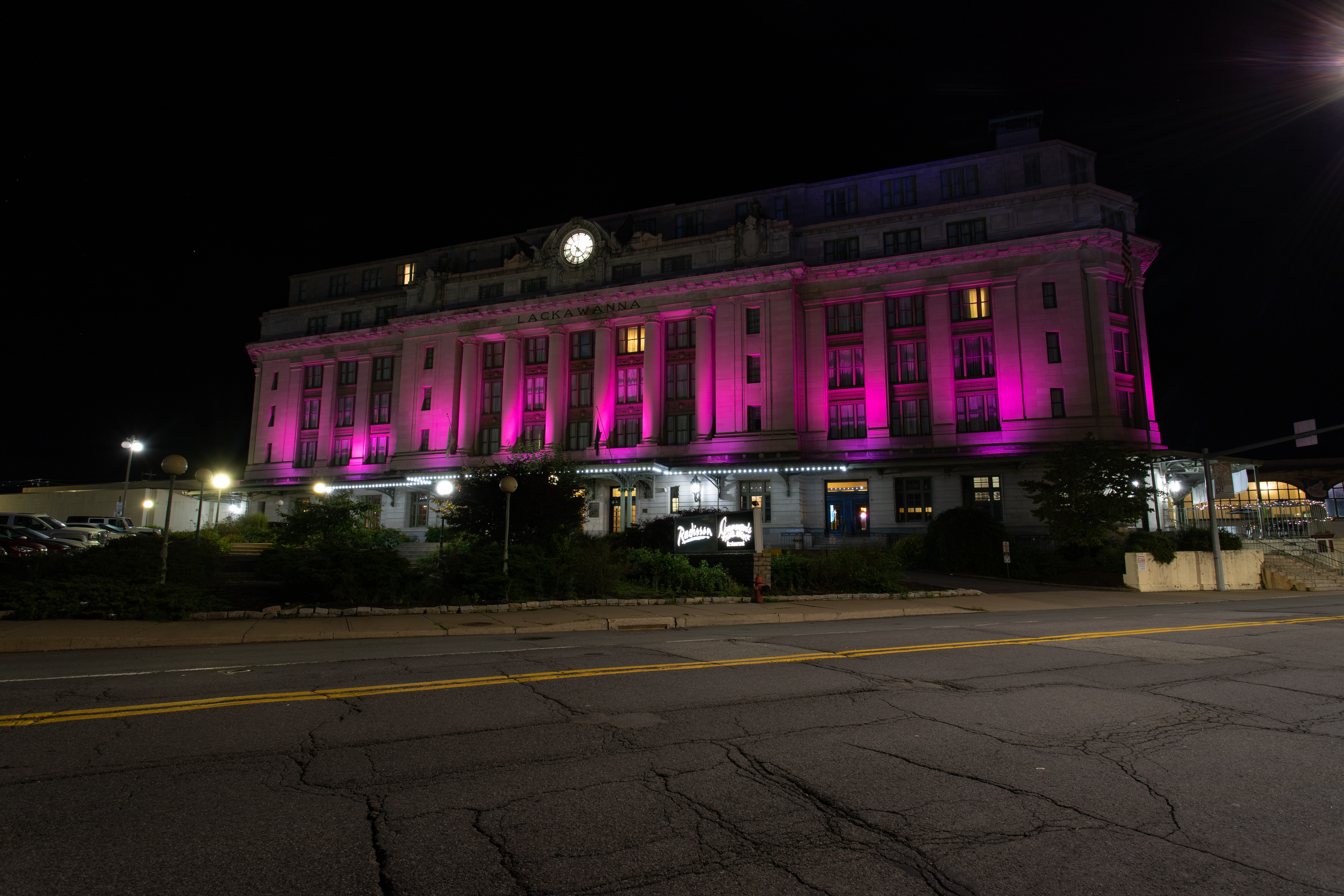

- Location within Pennsylvania
- Former names: Delaware, Lackawanna and Western Railroad Station

General information
- Type: Hotel
- Architectural style: Neoclassical
- Location: 700 Lackawanna Avenue; Scranton, Pennsylvania; United States
- Coordinates: 41°24′20″N 75°39′41″W
- Completed: 1908
- Renovated: 1982–1983
- Cost: $600,000
- Affiliation: Radisson

Technical details
- Floor count: 6

Design and construction
- Architect: Kenneth MacKenzie Murchison

Website
- www.radisson.com/scrantonpa

U.S. National Register of Historic Places
- Official name: Delaware, Lackawanna and Western Railroad Station
- Designated: December 6, 1977
- Reference no.: 77001170

The Radisson Lackawanna Station Hotel, which was built as the Delaware, Lackawanna and Western Railroad Station, is a French Renaissance-style building in Scranton, Pennsylvania.

== History and architectural features ==
This historic structure was built as a train station and office building in 1908. It closed in 1970, was listed on the U.S. National Register of Historic Places on December 6, 1977; and was then renovated and reopened as a hotel in 1983.

The building retains its original clocks, doors, fountains, stairs, ceilings, walls, and overall appearance.

== Station ==
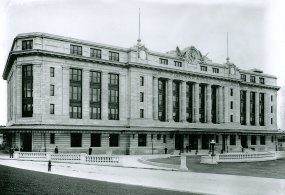
The station at its 1908 opening

In the early 1900s, Delaware, Lackawanna and Western Railroad president William Truesdale approved a plan to replace the railroad's Scranton station, an old brick structure located on Lackawanna Avenue near Franklin Avenue. The new station, to be built about seven blocks east at 700 Lackawanna Avenue, would be a far grander structure that would also house the railroad's offices, with the exception of the executive offices in New York City. The railroad commissioned New York architect Kenneth MacKenzie Murchison, who executed the design in a neoclassical style reminiscent of the Ecole des Beaux-Arts in Paris, where he had been trained.

Constructed of brick and steel at a cost of around $600,000, it has concrete floors and partitions. The exterior is faced with Indiana limestone and it has an eight-foot bronze clock on the façade. The main entrance leading to the former waiting room is furnished in Formosa, a soft, pinkish-yellow Italian marble. Its Grand Lobby, two-and-a-half stories tall, has an ornamented mosaic tile floor, a barrel-vaulted Tiffany stained-glass ceiling, rare Siena marble walls, and 36 unique Grueby Faience tile murals. The tiles are styled after the work of American artist Clark Greenwood Voorhees, and represent scenes along the DL&W's Phoebe Snow main line from Hoboken, New Jersey, to Buffalo, New York.

A tall radio antenna was installed after a while on the roof; the railroad was a pioneer in the use of wireless communications between trains and terminals.

The building, which was originally five stories tall, had a sixth added for office space by 1923.

The last train, the Erie Lackawanna's Lake Cities, left the station on January 6, 1970. The building was shuttered and neglected, its windows cracking. The marbled lobby was used to store old timetables and railroad ledgers. The dilapidated exterior can be seen briefly in the movie That Championship Season, which was released shortly before the renovations.

=== Passenger services ===
Into the mid-1960s, the station served several passenger Erie Lackawanna Railroad (successor to the Delaware, Lackawanna and Western) trains:

- Phoebe Snow (Hoboken-Buffalo)
- Owl (westbound) / New York Mail (eastbound) (night train, Hoboken-Buffalo)
- Lake Cities (night train, Hoboken-Chicago)
- Pocono Express (westbound) / Twilight (eastbound) (Hoboken-Scranton, in 1950s to Buffalo)

Additionally, in earlier years, there was the Keystone Express/Pittsburgh Express (night train to Pittsburgh via Kingston, Bloomsburg and Harrisburg) and unnamed trains to Utica and to Oswego via Syracuse.

== Hotel ==
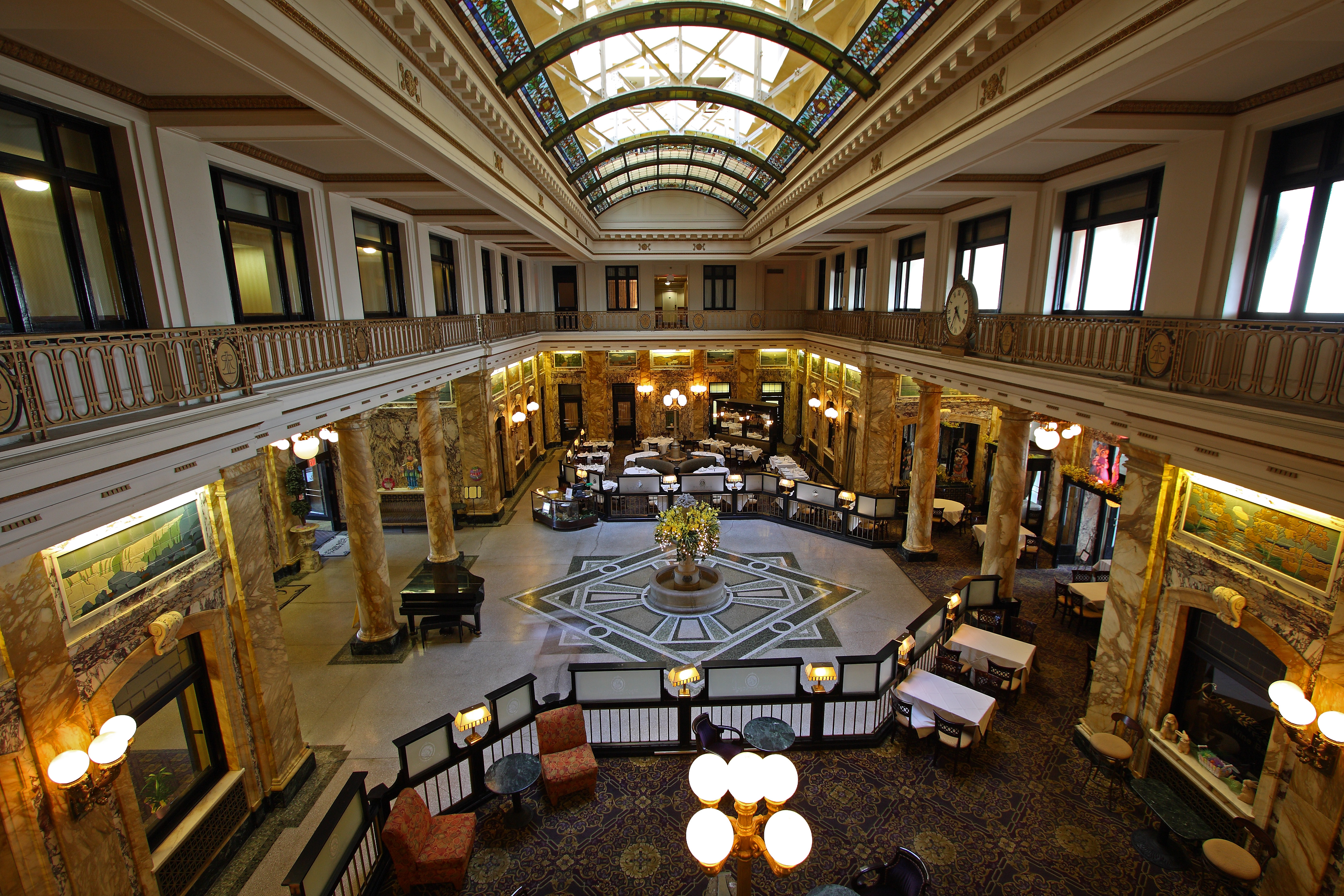
The Grand Lobby in 2009.

During the early 1980s, as Scranton struggled with 13 percent unemployment and a slumping economy, city leaders conceived of a redeveloped station as tourist attraction and rallying point. "Basically, we're looking for people to come to Scranton who would not come to Scranton normally," Mayor James McNulty told the Associated Press in 1982. "We want to give the hotel a dimension as a destination instead of a way station, so this can be some place to go."

The building was later purchased by MetroAction, a Scranton Chamber of Commerce corporation that focused on downtown development. Its redevelopment, the "linchpin of Scranton's downtown revitalization program", was ultimately spearheaded by The Erie Lackawanna Restoration Associates, a group of private investors, and funded to the tune of $13 million through a combination of federal, state, and municipal money, plus donations from banks and other local businesses. The building was renovated as a hotel, furnished by Bethlehem Furniture Manufacturing Corp., and renamed The Hilton at Lackawanna Station. The renovation work was designed by Buchanan Ricciuti & Associates Architects, Inc., and won a 1984 Design Honor Award from the Ohio chapter of the American Institute of Architects.

The building reopened on New Year's Eve 1983, ushered back to life by some 650 partygoers dancing to the Guy Lombardo Orchestra under the direction of Art Mooney.

The station renovation was just half of the railroad-related repurposing meant to enliven downtown Scranton; the other half was Steamtown USA, a museum being built on the site of the old Lackawanna railyard and shops. On February 3, 1984, McNulty stood before the station to welcome the first of Steamtown's exhibits to the city: a 350-ton Canadian Pacific steam locomotive chugging up with a baggage car and five passenger cars. "Welcome to the first day of Scranton's new future," McNulty told a crowd, which cheered.

In 1993, the hotel was purchased for $4 million by DanMar Hotel Inc., which shifted its hotel-chain affiliation two years later from Hilton to Radisson.

DanMar began trying to sell the building in December 2004, to the University of Scranton, many of whose visitors stayed at the hotel, but university officials formally declined the offer in May 2005. DanMar ultimately sold the building for $7 million to Akshar Lackawanna Station Hospitality LP, a unit of El Centro, Calif.-based Calvin Investments LLC, which owned about a dozen hotels at the time. The contract was signed in July 2005 and the sale was completed in October. The new owners pledged to spend $1.5 million to $1.7 million on renovations, to wrap-up in summer 2006, but the work actually took place in 2007 through 2009.

The hotel was the setting, though not the actual filming location, for "Dwight's Speech" in the American television show The Office. Many of the show's cast members stayed at the hotel during the October 2007 fan convention and again during the show's public wrap party in May 2013.

Passenger train service to Scranton may be restored by future phases of the Lackawanna Cut-Off Restoration Project, which could extend New Jersey Transit (NJ Transit) service from New York City and Hoboken via the Lackawanna Cut-Off. The trains would pass the old Lackawanna Station building and pull in at a new Scranton station on Lackawanna Avenue.

== Gallery ==
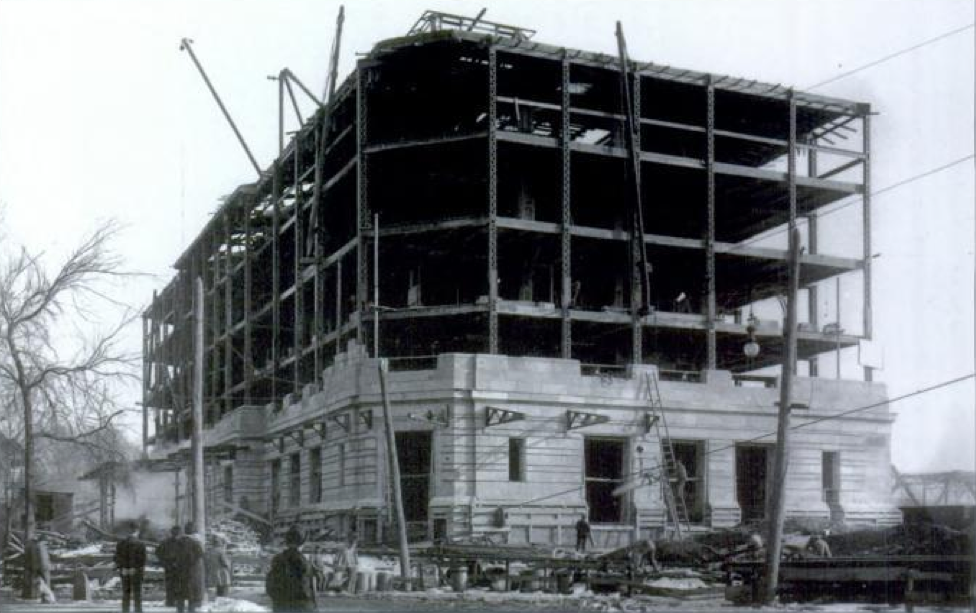
The station under construction in 1907.

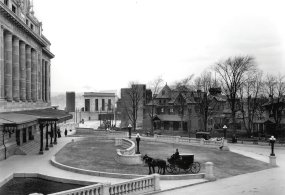
A horse and carriage outside the station in 1908.

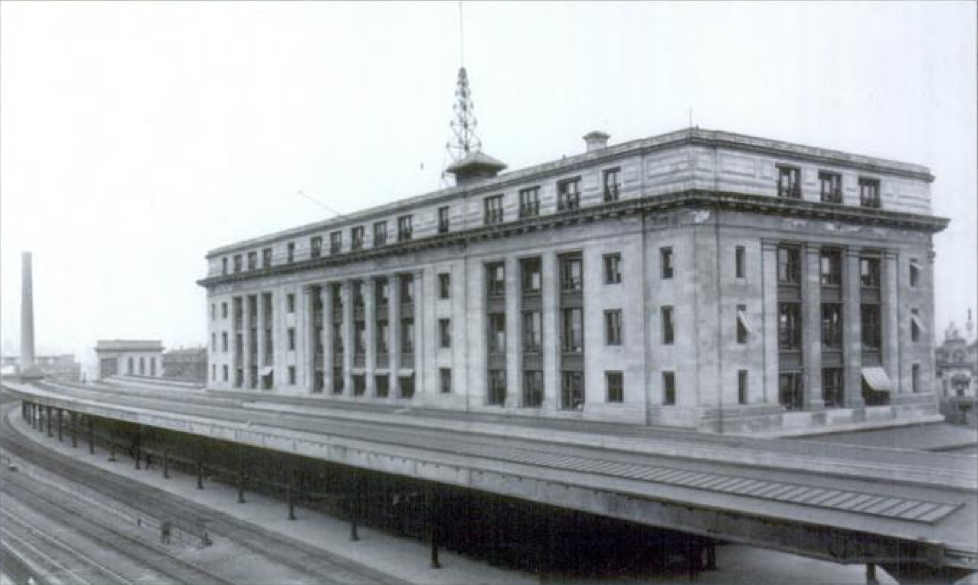
A 1914 photo shows the rooftop radio antenna.

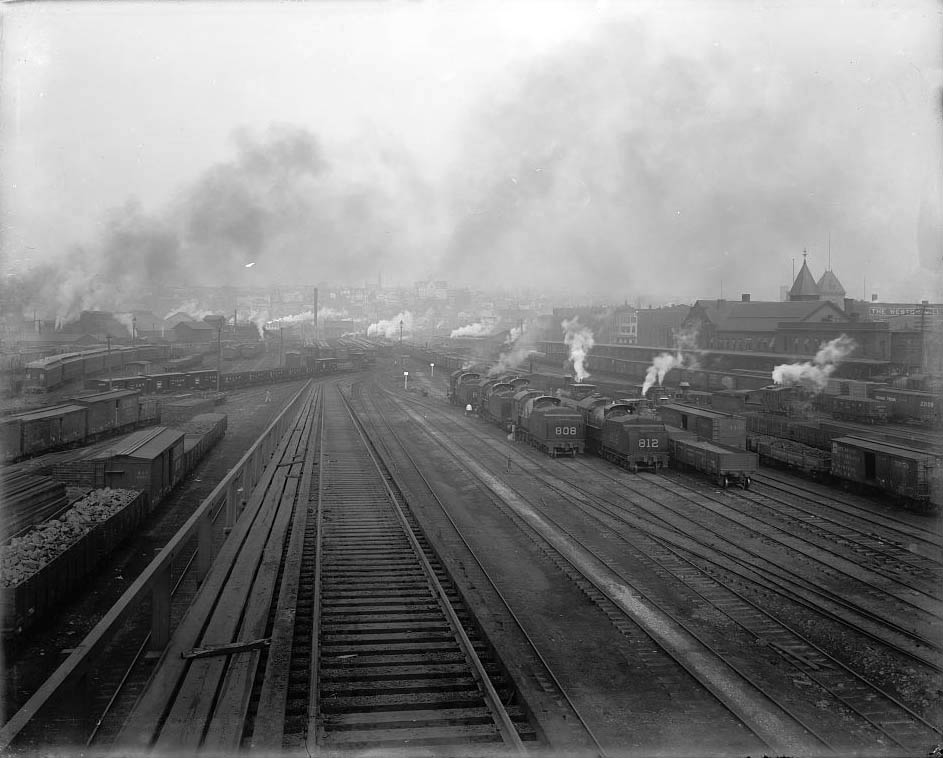
The old station the current building replaced seen on the right, sometime between 1890 and 1901.

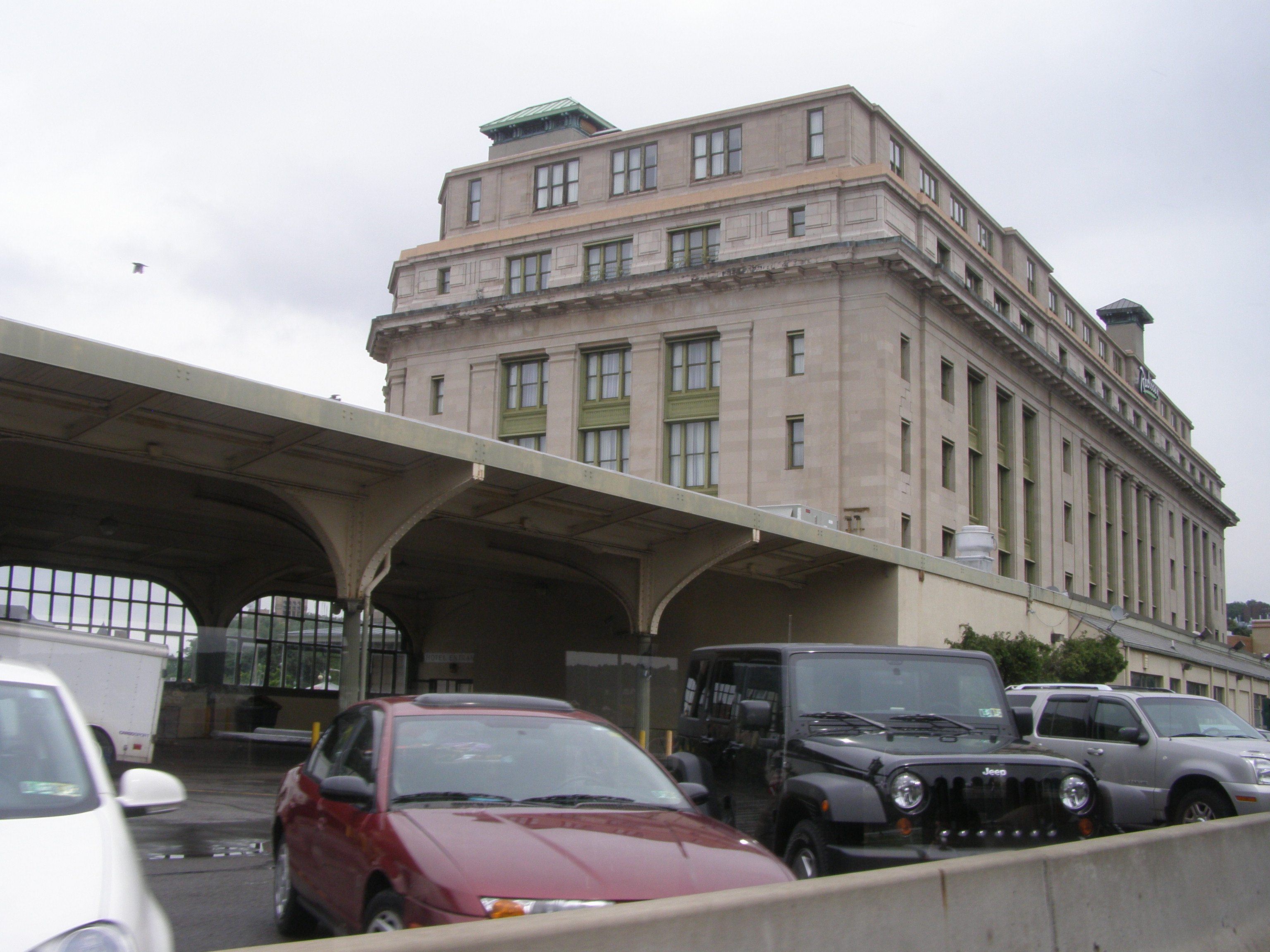
Trackside of the hotel/former station on June 23, 2011. The former canopy once housed two stub-end tracks and is now used for parking space. Parking in the foreground now occupies space where two through tracks stood along with part of the canopy that has since been demolished.

Waiting room shortly after opening

== See also ==
- Scranton station (Central Railroad of New Jersey)
