= Analomink, Pennsylvania =

Unincorporated community in Pennsylvania, US

Analomink
- Unincorporated area
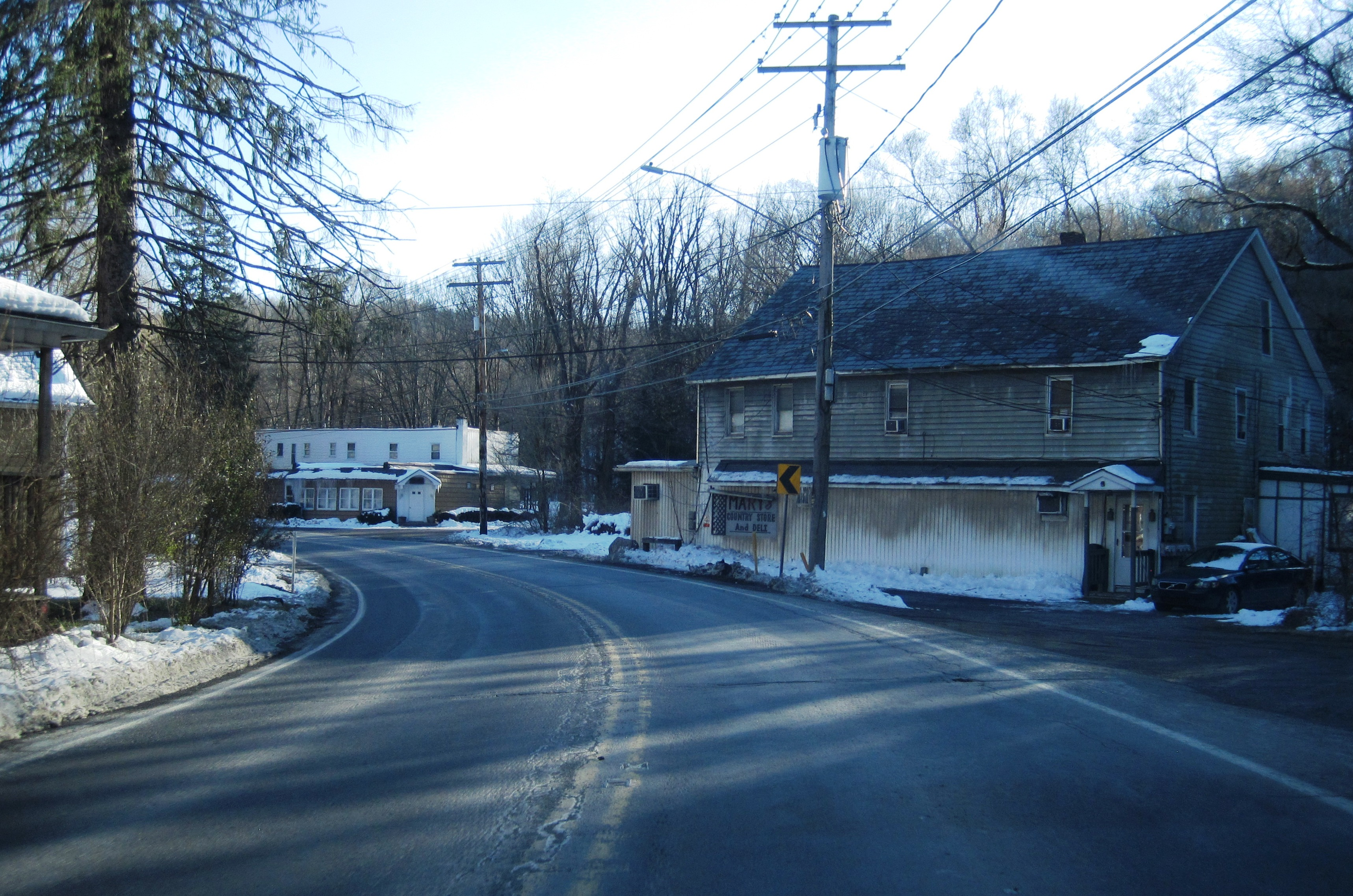
- Southbound PA 191/PA 447 through Analomink

- Location of Analomink in Pennsylvania Analomink (the United States)
- Coordinates: 41°03′04″N 75°13′14″W
- Country: United States
- State: Pennsylvania
- County: Monroe
- Townships: Stroud
- Elevation: 862 ft (263 m)
- Time zone: UTC-5 (EST)
  - Summer (DST): UTC-4 (EDT)
- ZIP Code: 18320
- Area code: 570

Analomink is a section of Stroud Township, Pennsylvania. It was founded in 1848 and originally known as Spragueville, due to the village's sprag manufacturing industry. Around 1906, the villagers changed its name to Analomink, a name long associated with the region.

== See also ==
- Analomink (NJT station)
