= Pennsylvania Northeast Regional Railroad Authority =

Overview
- Operator: Delaware-Lackawanna Railroad
- Headquarters: Scranton, Pennsylvania, U.S.
- Locale: Lackawanna County; Monroe County; Northampton County; Wayne County
- Dates of operation: May 2006–present
- Predecessors: Lackawanna Railroad Authority; Monroe County Rail Authority

Technical
- Track gauge: 1,435 mm (4 ft 8 1/2 in) standard gauge
- Length: 95 miles (153 km)

Other
- Website: pnrra.org

The Pennsylvania Northeast Regional Railroad Authority (PNRRA) is a bi-county creation of both Lackawanna and Monroe counties to oversee the use of common rail freight lines in Northeastern Pennsylvania. The designated freight operator of the Pennsylvania Northeast Regional Rail Authority lines is the Delaware-Lackawanna Railroad and tourism operator is Steamtown National Historic Site.

One of its primary objectives is to re-establish rail passenger service with New Jersey Transit between Scranton, Pennsylvania and Hoboken, New Jersey by way of the Lackawanna Cut-Off, with connecting service to Manhattan, New York. Amtrak is also a possibility for passenger rail service to Scranton by way of the Lackawanna Cut-Off.

== History ==
The PNRRA was formed in May 2006, when Lackawanna and Monroe counties agreed to merge their rail authorities. The consensus reached was that the operation of the railroad needed to be a multi-county venture and that a regional approach was necessary as trackage begins and ends outside individual county boundaries. In addition, it was felt that the pooling of resources was necessary in order to operate a railroad in a very competitive environment and, conversely, to obtain the funding necessary to operate a railroad from the State and Federal governments.

The Lackawanna County Railroad Authority was established in 1985 had over 16 million dollars in assets and operates more than 66 miles (106 km) of track in Lackawanna, Wayne and Monroe Counties. The Monroe County Rail Authority was created in 1980, and controlled over 12 million dollars in assets, with trackage totaling 29 miles (47 km).

In 2007 the Agency received the 5th Annual John J. Luciania Award for regionalism from the NEPA Alliance, the Agency that serves as the RPO and MPO for the two regions that are working together to implement passenger rail.

== Trackage ==
The Pennsylvania Northeast Regional Railroad Authority owns the following lines:

- The former Delaware and Hudson Railway's Pennsylvania Branch/Penn Division main line from Scranton, northeast to the city of Carbondale, now called the Carbondale Mainline.
- The former Delaware, Lackawanna and Western Railroad main line, now called the Pocono Mainline, also known as Pocono Main, towards New Jersey and New York City from Scranton to Slateford Junction. The Pocono Mainline has hosted a number of excursions, including excursions of the Nickel Plate 765.
- From Southwest Scranton to Montage Mountain, Moosic on lines of the former Lackawanna and Wyoming Valley Railroad third-rail interurban streetcar line as well as a segment of the Erie Lackawanna Railroad's Wyoming Division. This line is called the "Laurel Line". The Laurel Line also connects with the "Minooka Industrial Track".

== Staff ==
- Lawrence C. Malski (President)
- Charlene W. Doyle (Vice President of Administration)
