= Lackawanna Transit Center =

Bus station in Scranton, Pennsylvania

Scranton

General information
- Location: 30 Lackawanna Avenue, Scranton, Pennsylvania 18503
- Coordinates: 41.41032°N 75.67135°W
- Line: Pocono Mainline
- Connections: County of Lackawanna Transit System; Luzerne County Transportation Authority; Amtrak Thruway; Greyhound Lines; Martz Trailways; Trailways of New York; Fullington Trailways

Construction
- Parking: Yes

Other information
- Station code: SRN (Amtrak)

History
- Opened: December 7, 2015 (buses only); Rail station proposed

Proposed services
Preceding station	NJ Transit	Following station
Terminus	Lackawanna Cut-Off	Tobyhanna toward New York or Hoboken
Location

Lackawanna Transit Center is the main bus station and a proposed train station in Scranton, Pennsylvania, operated by the County of Lackawanna Transit System (COLTS).

Opened in 2015, the transit center features an indoor waiting area, covered bus bays, a park-and-ride lot, and pick-up/drop-off lanes. As of 2021, it is served by COLTS, Luzerne County Transportation Authority (LCTA), Amtrak Thruway, Greyhound Lines, Martz Trailways, New York Trailways, and Fullington Trailways.

Located at the corner of Lackawanna and Cliff avenues in downtown Scranton, the transit center is close to Steamtown National Historic Site, the Electric City Trolley Museum, and the Marketplace at Steamtown. The site is also adjacent to the Pocono Mainline of the Delaware-Lackawanna Railroad, and is intended to accommodate proposed expansion of the bus station into an intermodal train and bus terminal with rail service to New York City via the Lackawanna Cut-Off.

== History ==
A groundbreaking ceremony for the Lackawanna Transit Center took place on August 1, 2014. Plans for the project were said to have been "18 years in the making." A ribbon-cutting occurred on November 20, 2015, and the station first served buses on December 7. The total cost came to $12.5 million.

=== Proposed train station ===
From 1908 through 1970, passenger trains to Scranton used the Lackawanna Railroad's large station, now a Radisson hotel. The Lackawanna Cut-Off Restoration Project is an ongoing effort to revive passenger rail from New York to Scranton, with construction already underway on Phase I: an NJ Transit extension from Lake Hopatcong to Andover, New Jersey. The bus station was built on the site that had long been considered for Scranton's new train station. In spring 2021, Amtrak announced plans for a potential New York–Scranton route.
