= Washington station (New Jersey) =

Former railway station in New Jersey, US

WASHINGTON
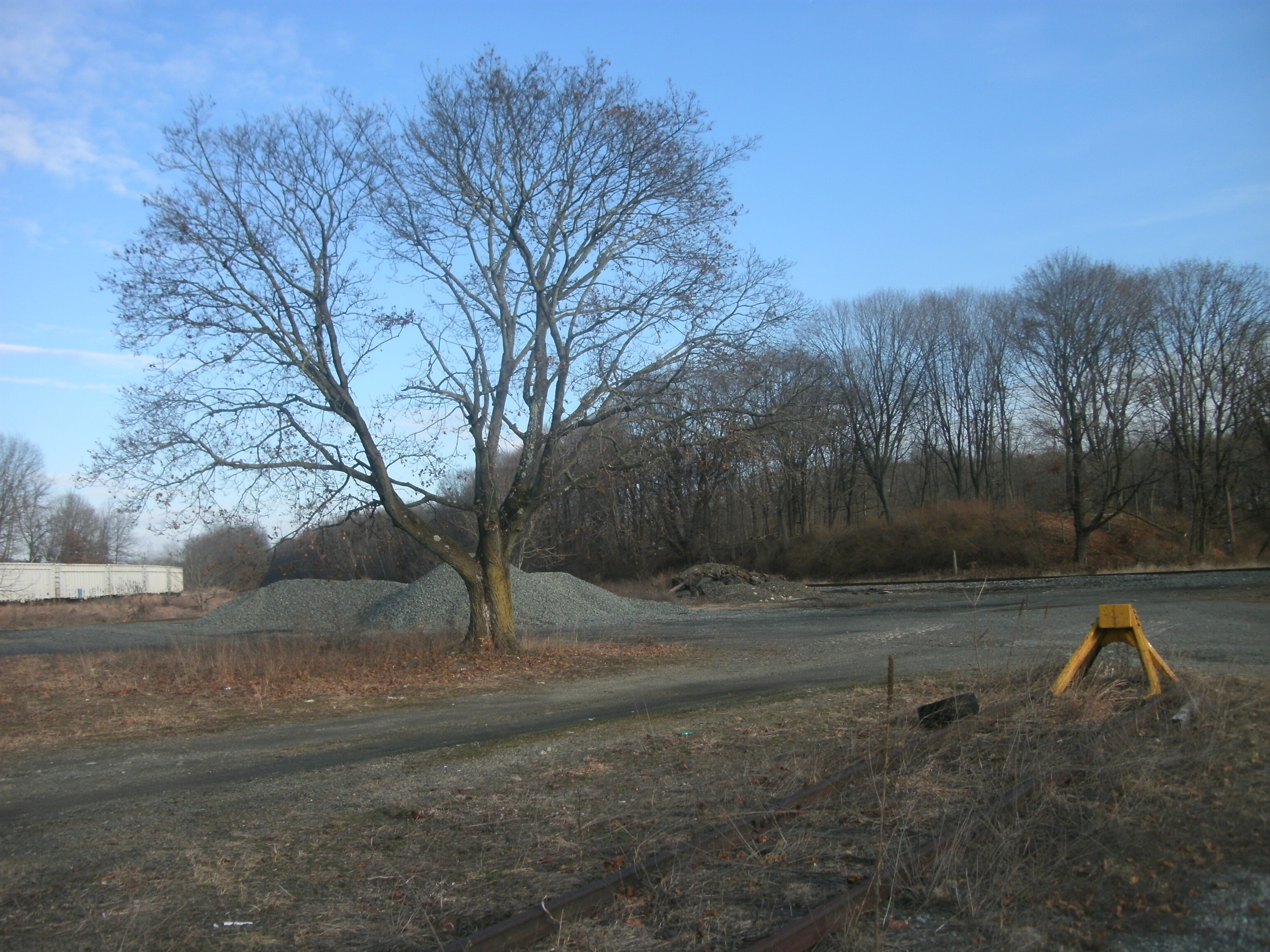
- The former station site of the Washington station as seen from the former freight platform.

General information
- Location: 81 Railroad Avenue, Washington, Warren County, New Jersey 07882
- Lines: Old Main Line; Hampton Branch; Phillipsburg Branch

Other information
- Station code: 921 (Morris and Essex); 1200 (Phillipsburg Branch); 1300 (Hampton Branch)

History
- Opened: May 27, 1856
- Closed: September 30, 1966
- Rebuilt: 1867; 1900

Key dates
- March 20, 1926: Delaware, Lackawanna and Western Railroad discontinues passenger service to Hampton
- June 20, 1943: Delaware, Lackawanna and Western Railroad discontinues passenger service to Phillipsburg
- March 15, 1944: Delaware, Lackawanna and Western Railroad discontinues passenger service to Portland

Former services
Preceding station	Delaware, Lackawanna and Western Railroad	Following station
Oxford Furnace toward Portland	Old Main Line	Port Murray toward Lake Hopatcong
Stewartsville toward Phillipsburg	Phillipsburg Branch	Terminus
Changewater toward Hampton	Hampton Branch	Terminus
- Washington Railroad Station
- U.S. National Register of Historic Places
- New Jersey Register of Historic Places
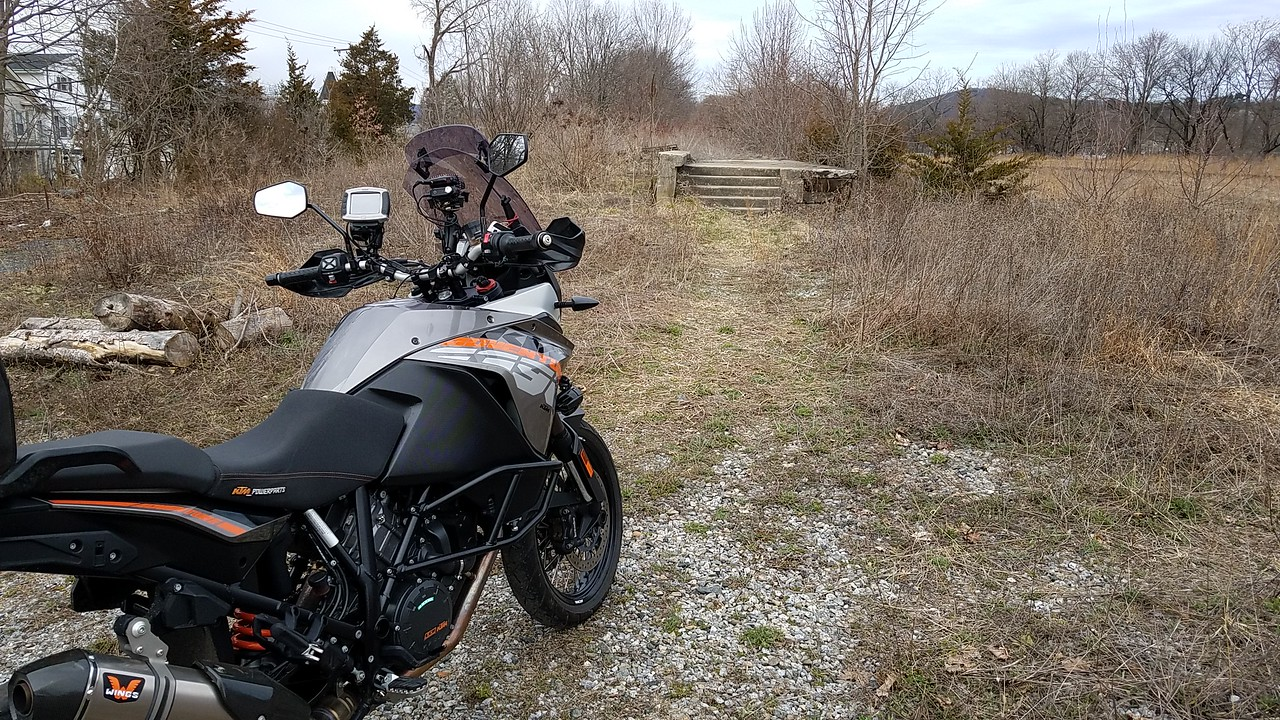
- The site of the former freight platform.

- Location within Warren County, New Jersey Location within New Jersey Location within the United States
- Location: Railroad Avenue, Washington, New Jersey
- Coordinates: 40°45′30″N 74°58′6″W
- Built: 1900
- Architect: Delaware Lackawanna & Western R.R.
- NRHP reference No.: 79001532
- NJRHP No.: 2794

Significant dates
- Added to NRHP: July 3, 1979
- Designated NJRHP: March 29, 1979
Location

Washington is a former commuter railroad train station in the borough of Washington, Warren County, New Jersey. The station serviced trains operated by the Delaware, Lackawanna and Western Railroad on three different lines. Washington station handled the Lackawanna Old Road, which came from Port Morris Junction and continued to Portland, Pennsylvania; the Hampton Branch, which went to Hampton's Central Railroad of New Jersey station in Hunterdon County; and the Phillipsburg Branch, which operated to Phillipsburg Union Station. Washington station contained a single large brick depot and multiple platforms.

Railroad service to Washington began with the opening of the Warren Railroad on May 27, 1856, between Delaware and Hampton. The Delaware, Lackawanna and Western Railroad took over operations the next year when they agreed to a perpetual lease. Service from the Morris and Essex Railroad joined in 1864, with an extension to Phillipsburg opening in 1865. The railroads built a new station depot in 1867 that would remain until 1900. On December 24, 1911, the Lackawanna Cut-Off opened between Slateford Junction, Pennsylvania and Port Morris, resulting in the station becoming part of a branch. Through the 1920s and 1940s, the Lackawanna started discontinuing passenger services. Passenger service between Washington and Hampton ended on March 20, 1926, and service to Phillipsburg ended on June 20, 1943. The former main line alignment stopped operations north of Washington on March 15, 1944. Service to Washington officially ended on September 30, 1966, when the line from Washington to Port Morris ended service as part of cuts made by the Erie-Lackawanna Railroad.

Washington station joined the National Register of Historic Places on July 3, 1979, as the Washington Railroad Station. The station was demolished in 1982.

== See also ==
- National Register of Historic Places listings in Warren County, New Jersey
- Lackawanna Old Road
- Phillipsburg Union Station

== Bibliography ==
- Conley, Paul M. (1923). Pamphlet on Coal Mines and Mining. Charleston, West Virginia: American Constitutional Association.
