= Phillipsburg Union Station =

Railroad station museum in Phillipsburg, New Jersey, USA

Philipsburg

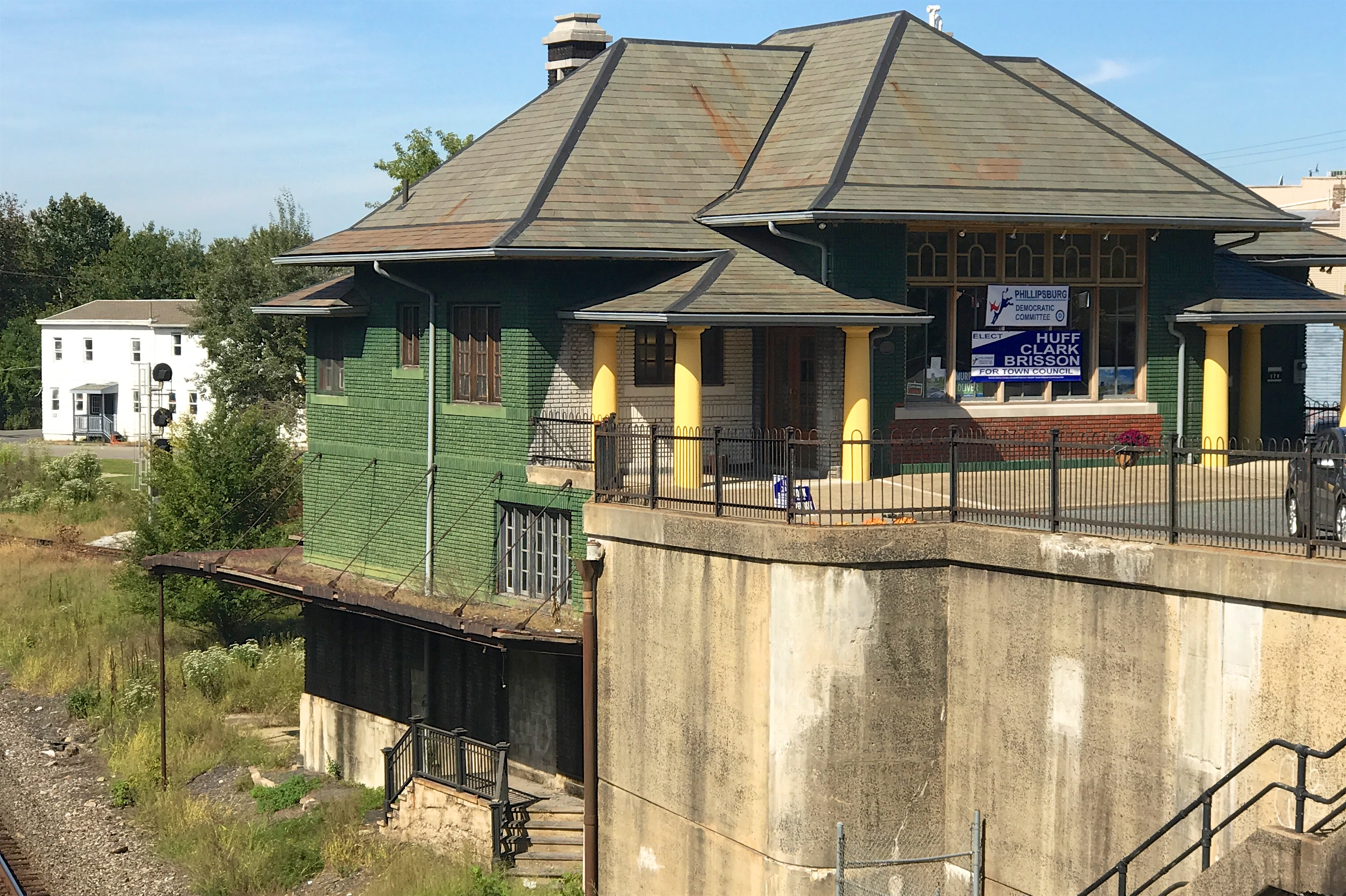

General information
- Location: 175 South Main Street, Phillipsburg, New Jersey 08865
- Coordinates: 40.688231°N 75.198826°W
- Platforms: 2
- Tracks: 2

History
- Closed: December 30, 1983

Key dates
- June 20, 1943: Delaware, Lackawanna and Western Railroad discontinues passenger service
- December 30, 1983: NJ Transit ends commuter service

Former services
Preceding station	NJ Transit	Following station
Terminus	Raritan Valley Line	Hampton toward Newark Penn
Preceding station	Central Railroad of New Jersey	Following station
Bethlehem toward Scranton	Main Line	High Bridge toward Jersey City
Easton toward Scranton	Main Line	Vulcanite toward Jersey City
Preceding station	Delaware, Lackawanna and Western Railroad	Following station
Terminus	Phillipsburg Branch	Stewartsville toward Washington
Location

Phillipsburg Union Station is an active railroad station museum, in Phillipsburg, New Jersey, United States, at 178 South Main Street. Opened in 1914, Union Station was built by the Delaware, Lackawanna & Western Railroad (DL&W) and shared with the Central Railroad of New Jersey (CNJ) and was situated where the lines merged before the bridge crossing the Delaware River. Designed by Frank J. Nies, the architect who produced many of DL&W stations now listed state and federal registers of historic places, the 2 1/2 story, 3 bay brick building is unusual example of a union station and a representation of early 20th century Prairie style architecture. The Phillipsburg Union Signal Tower, or PU Tower, is nearby, also restored to its original form, and available for tours.

== History ==
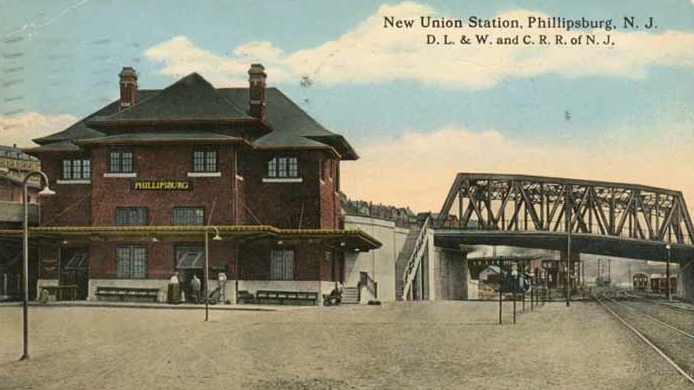
1914 postcard of the station, facing the Central Railroad of New Jersey side

Situated at the confluence of the Delaware River and the Lehigh River, Phillipsburg has historically been a major transportation hub. From the 1820s to 1920s, it was the western terminus of the Morris Canal, which connected it by water eastward to the Port of New York and New Jersey and westward via the Lehigh Canal across the Delaware River.

Five major railroads converged in Phillipsburg: the Central Railroad of New Jersey (CNJ), which first ran in 1852, the DL&W's Morris and Essex Railroad, the Lehigh and Hudson River Railway (L&HR), Lehigh Valley Railroad (LVRR), and the Pennsylvania Railroad's (PRR) Belvidere Delaware Railroad.

The South Easton and Phillipsburg Railroad of New Jersey, and the South Easton and Phillipsburg Railroad of Pennsylvania was organized on July 25, 1889, to build a bridge over the Delaware River between Easton, Pennsylvania, and Phillipsburg. The former built 460' on the New Jersey side, while the latter built 850' on the Pennsylvania side. Bridge construction began on November 19, 1889, and concluded the following year on October 2. Subsequently, the L&HR obtained trackage rights over 13 miles of the Pennsylvania Railroad's (PRR) Belvidere Delaware Railroad between Phillipsburg and Belvidere; once the bridge was completed, the L&HR had a continuous line from Maybrook, New York, to Easton. At Easton, an interchange could be made with the Central Railroad of New Jersey and Lehigh Valley Railroad, while interchange with the PRR was at Phillipsburg. In 1908, L&HR lost the trackage rights from Phillipsburg to Belvidere as PRR took them back.

After the 1911 opening of the Lackawanna Cut-Off, the DL&W ran services on the Phillipsburg Branch of what became known as the Lackawanna Old Road. In April 1970, its successor Erie Lackawanna Railway (EL) abandoned the line. CNJ passenger service ran until the 1960s, its final named train being the Harrisburg-Jersey City Queen of the Valley. Passenger service ended in 1970, only to resume in 1976 under Conrail as part of the Raritan Valley Line. NJ Transit, successor to Conrail as operator, discontinued service between Phillipsburg and High Bridge on December 30, 1983. The physical connection of the Raritan Valley Line to Phillipsburg was severed in 1989. The CNJ line and bridge, owned by NJ Transit, became part of Norfolk Southern's Lehigh Line.

== Status, rail trail and service restoration studies ==
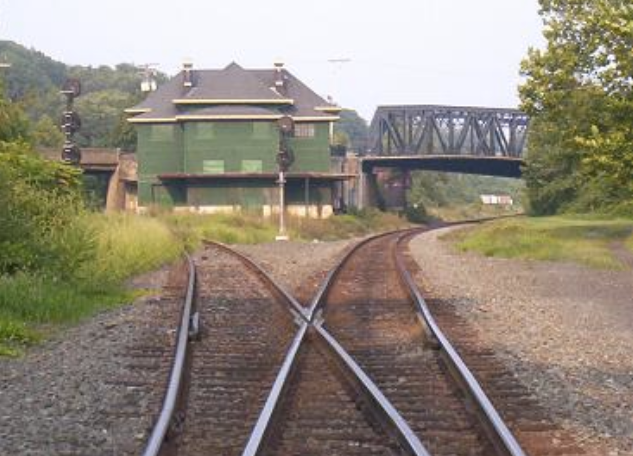
East with CNJ and DL&W tracks

Union Station received of certificate of eligibility for listing on state and national registers of historic places from the State Historic Preservation Office in November 2003 (ID#4228). The New Jersey Transportation Heritage Center operated a mini museum and information center, performed some renovations, and built a collection.

The Phillipsburg Union Signal Tower, which controlled movement to the station and was taken out of service by New Jersey Transit in 1983, has also undergone restoration.

An extension of New Jersey Transit Rail Operations Raritan Valley Line from High Bridge station through Glen Gardner, Hampton, Bloomsbury/Bethlehem, NJ and Phillipsburg, in connection with the Norfolk Southern Lehigh Line into Northampton County Pennsylvania, has been considered. In 2010, Easton Mayor Sal Panto Jr. promoted the restoration of commuter rail service to Easton or Phillipsburg, and possibly beyond Easton, continuing into Allentown or Bethlehem.

Studies have also been conducted to connect the station to rail trails.

The freight line, the Washington Secondary, passes the station, but is limited in what traffic it can carry due to height restrictions presented by the bridge at the station.

== See also ==
- List of stations on the Central Railroad of New Jersey
- Washington station (New Jersey)
- Lackawanna Old Road
- Northampton Street Bridge
- List of bridges documented by the Historic American Engineering Record in New Jersey
- Belvidere and Delaware River Railway
