= Hampton Branch =

Hampton Branch may refer to the following railroad lines:

- The Hampton Branch (Virginia), a railroad line in the U.S. state of Virginia, also known as the Peninsula Extension
- The Hampton Branch (New Jersey), an abandoned railroad line in the U.S. state of New Jersey, also known as the Warren Railroad
