= Hampton Branch (New Jersey) =

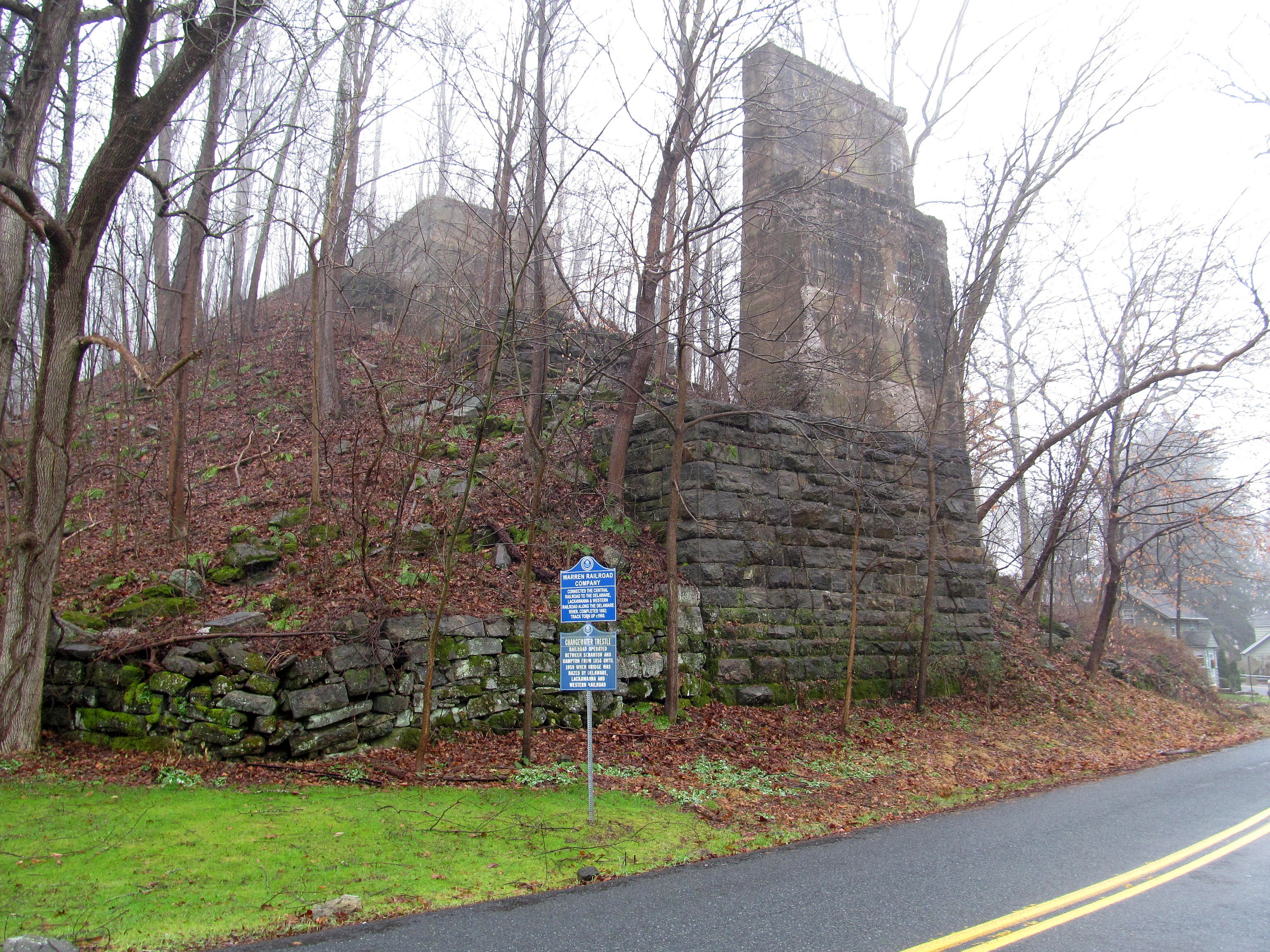
- Remnants of the trestle in Changewater, New Jersey

Overview
- Status: Abandoned

History
- Opened: May 28, 1856
- Closed: July 11, 1958

Technical
- Line length: 5.2 mi (8.4 km)
- Track gauge: 1,435 mm (4 ft 8 1/2 in) standard gauge
- Old gauge: 6 ft (1,829 mm)

The Hampton Branch was a railway line in the state of New Jersey. It ran 5.2 miles (8.4 km) from Hampton, New Jersey, to Washington, New Jersey, connecting the main line of the Central Railroad of New Jersey with the old main line of the Delaware, Lackawanna and Western Railroad (Lackawanna). It was built by the Warren Railroad in 1853–1856 and abandoned by the Lackawanna in 1958.

== History ==
Interests behind the Delaware, Lackawanna and Western Railroad, a Pennsylvania company, established the Warren Railroad in 1851 to construct a railway line from the Delaware Water Gap to Hampton, New Jersey. The line would connect the main line of the Lackawanna, then being extended south from Scranton, Pennsylvania, toward the Delaware Water Gap, with the main line of the Central Railroad of New Jersey at Hampton.

The full line opened on May 26, 1858, enabling through service between Scranton and Elizabethport, New Jersey. The Lackawanna leased the Warren Railroad on October 1, 1857. The Morris and Essex Railroad extended its main line west from Hackettstown to Phillipsburg in November 1865, crossing the Warren Railroad's line at Washington. The Lackawanna leased the Morris and Essex on December 31, 1868.

With the lease, the Morris and Essex's main line replaced the Central Railroad of New Jersey as the Lackawanna's outlet to New York, and the importance of the Warren Railroad's line between Washington and Hampton lessened. Lackawanna through traffic over the CNJ ended on April 1, 1875.

Passenger service between Washington and Hampton ended on September 18, 1926. The Interstate Commerce Commission granted the Lackawanna permission to abandon the line on July 11, 1958.
