= Changewater, New Jersey =

Populated place in Warren County, New Jersey, US

- Unincorporated community
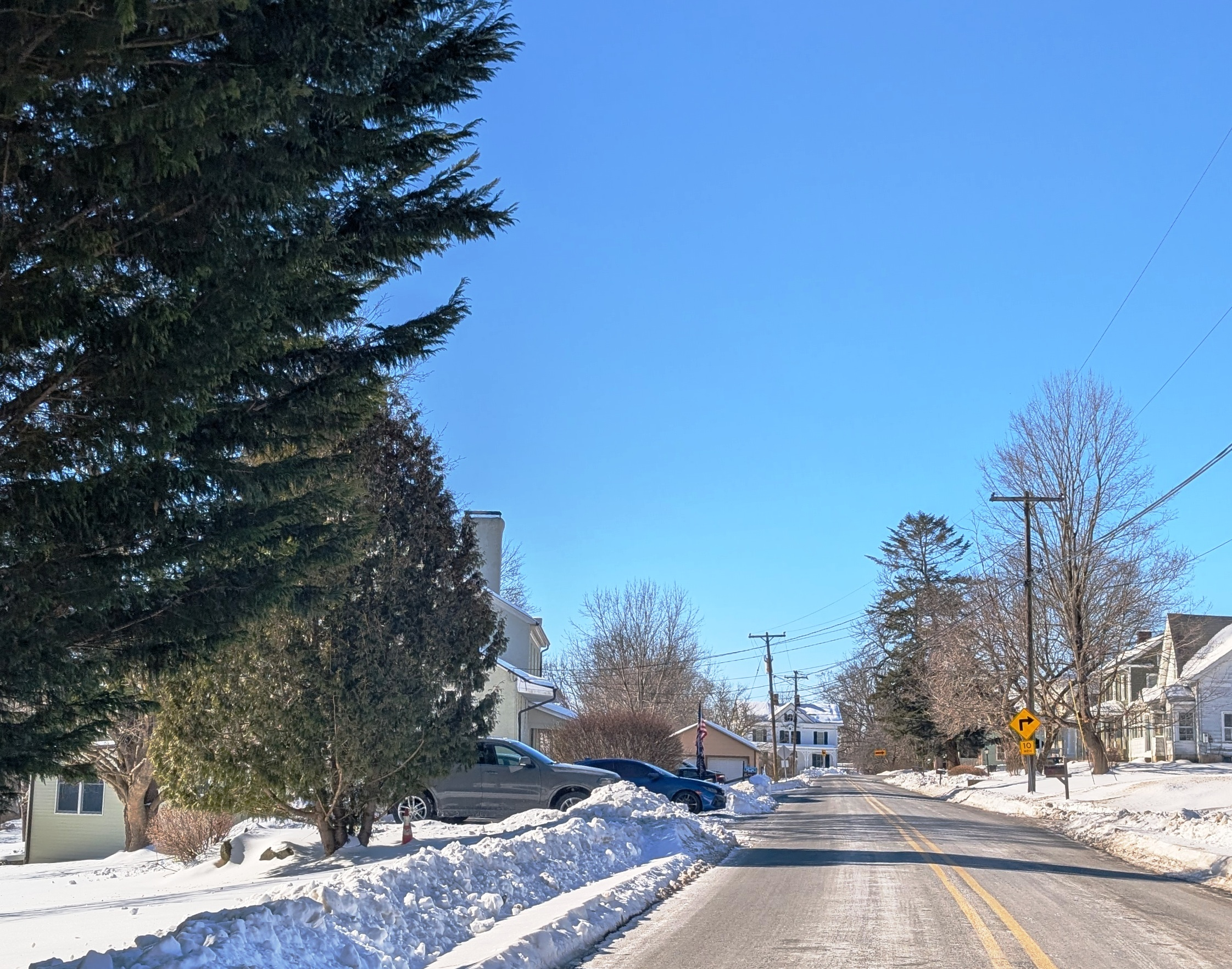
- Changewater Road in the center of the community

- Changewater's location in Warren County (Inset: Warren County in New Jersey) Changewater (New Jersey) Changewater (the United States)
- Coordinates: 40°44′17″N 74°56′39″W
- Country: United States
- State: New Jersey
- County: Warren
- Township: Washington
- Elevation: 400 ft (120 m)
- Time zone: UTC−05:00 (Eastern (EST))
  - Summer (DST): UTC−04:00 (EDT)
- ZIP code: 07831
- Area code: 908
- GNIS feature ID: 875365

Changewater is an unincorporated community located within Washington Township, in Warren County, in the U.S. state of New Jersey.

Changewater is located on the Musconetcong River 2.3 miles (3.7 km) southeast of Washington. The community was named for its location at the confluence of the upper and lower branches of the river.

Changewater had a post office with ZIP code 07831, which opened on September 26, 1859, and closed October 5, 2018.

== History ==
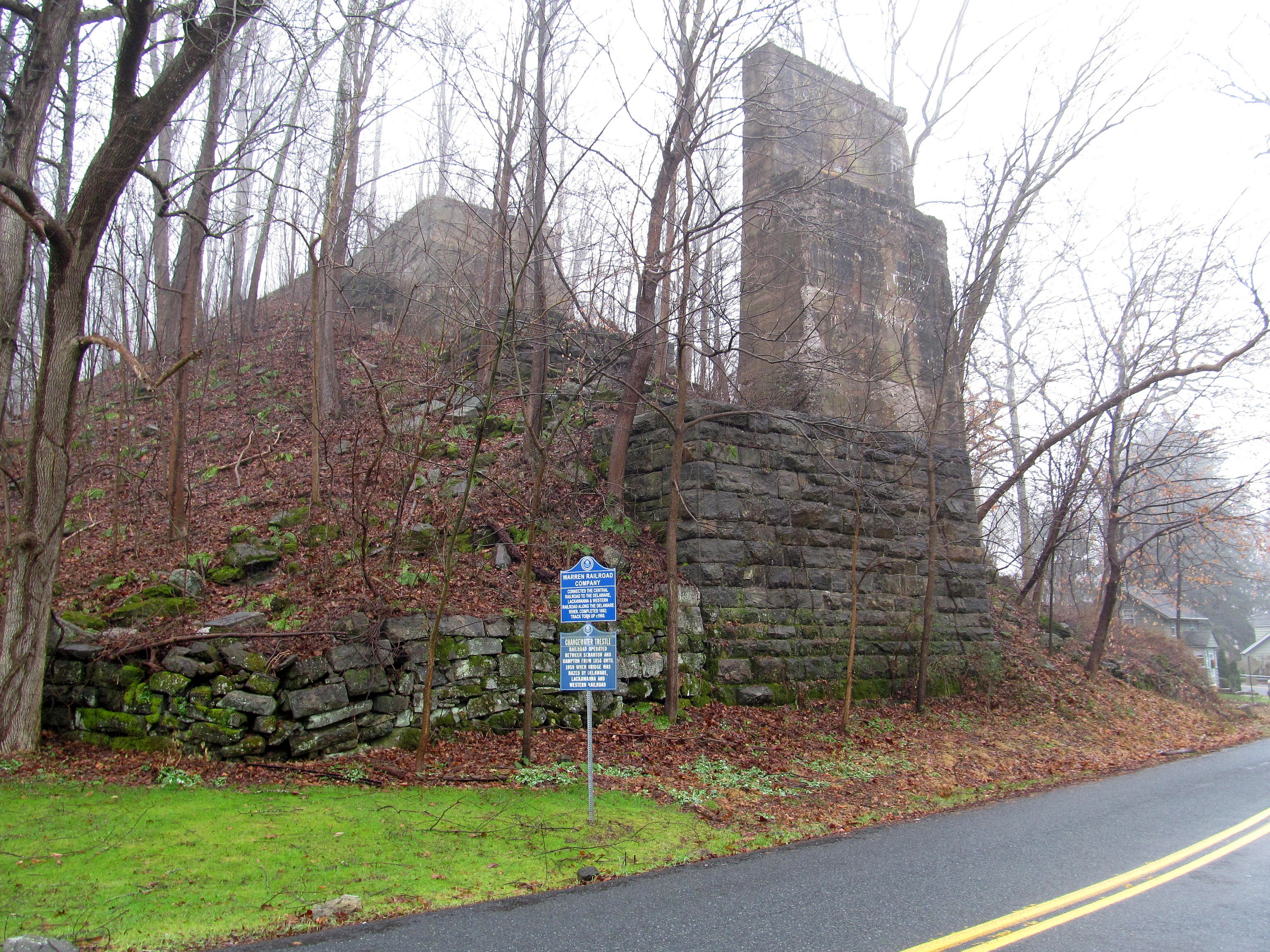
Remains of a trestle constructed by the Warren Railroad across the Musconetcong River at Changewater in 1856, part of the Delaware, Lackawanna and Western Railroad. A station was built nearby. Passenger service ended in 1926, and freight service stopped in 1958. The trestle was removed in 1959.

One of the early iron furnaces in the county—known as the Changewater Forge—was established here in the mid-1700s by Mark Thomson and later purchased by a well known local Van Leer family. Ledgers show Samuel Van Leer's sons B. Van Leer and Isaac Van Leer owning the property in the early 1800s.

In 1843, a farmer on his way to work came across the murdered body of a local resident named John Castner. Further investigation found that the victim’s wife, Maria Castner, their daughter, Maria Matilda Castner, and brother-in-law, John Parke, had been killed in a home nearby. The owner of the home, John Parke, was a wealthy man and robbery was quickly suspected to be the motive. The crime attracted widespread publicity, and in 1845, two men were convicted and hanged at the Warren County Court House.

During the 1800s, a number of industries were attempted in Changewater, including a tannery, woolen factory, flouring mill, picture frame factory, snuff factory, and distillery.

In 1874, the village consisted of a looking glass and picture framing factory, a store and post office, a grist mill, and eight residences.

By 1918, Changewater had a population of 200, and the A. T. Skerry woolen mill was its only industry.

== Notable people ==
People who were born in, residents of, or otherwise closely associated with Changewater include:

- Mark Thomson (1739–1803), politician who served as a United States representative from New Jersey
