= Netcong-Stanhope Cutoff =

New Jersey railroad line

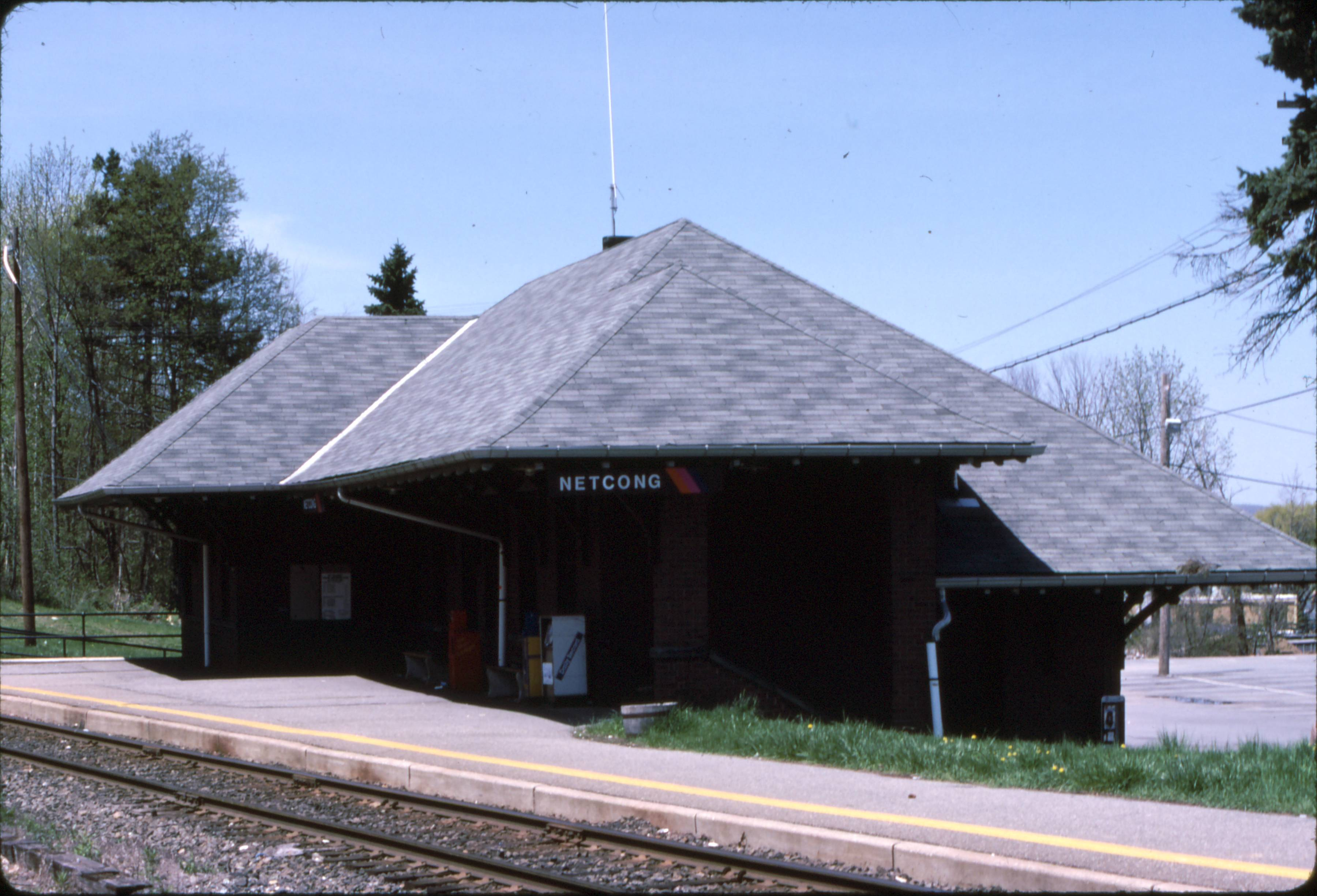
NJ Transit's Netcong Station in 1990 looking westbound in the direction of Waterloo. The track in the foreground is the former eastbound mainline. The westbound mainline track and the Sussex Branch track (Netcong-Stanhope Cutoff) were located in the lower area to the right, which is now a commuter parking lot.

The Netcong-Stanhope Cutoff was a three-mile-long line built by the Lackawanna Railroad in New Jersey in 1900. Built as part of the Sussex Branch, this was one of the first projects undertaken by the Lackawanna after William Truesdale became president in 1899. Up until the building of the cutoff, the connection between the Sussex Branch and the Morris & Essex Railroad was at Waterloo, New Jersey. Built with the intent of delivering anthracite coal from the west at Scranton, Pennsylvania, to towns along the Sussex Branch, the connection at Waterloo was not aligned to permit trains from the Sussex Branch to travel eastward towards New York. Although the Lackawanna could have left the line to Waterloo in place and simply built an eastbound connecting switch at Waterloo, there were compelling reasons to moving the connection eastward to Netcong.

First, Waterloo was widely perceived as being a bucolic backwater—a "canal town" (on the Morris Canal)—whereas Netcong, only two miles away, was a growing and prospering town. Second, building a bypass line to Netcong avoided the steepest part of the mainline west of Netcong. Third, trains would not have to cross the mainline at Waterloo; rather they could wait on their own track at what would be the new Netcong Station. And, fourth, Sussex Branch trains could be run into nearby Port Morris Yard.

With the building of the Netcong-Stanhope Cutoff, the line to Waterloo was immediately abandoned and torn out. Vestiges of the old line to Waterloo and the new line to Netcong (which itself was abandoned 77 years later) still exist. A new bridge over US Route 206 was built in the late 1980s, which preserved the integrity of the cutoff's right-of-way at that location.
