= Sussex Railroad =

- Sussex Railroad system map

Overview
- Headquarters: Newton, New Jersey
- Locale: Sussex County, New Jersey
- Dates of operation: 1853–1945
- Predecessor: Sussex Mine Railroad
- Successor: Delaware, Lackawanna & Western Railroad

Technical
- Track gauge: 4 ft 8 1/2 in (1,435 mm) standard gauge
- Previous gauge: 3 ft (914 mm) & 4 ft 10 in (1,473 mm)
- Length: 34 mi (55 km)

The Sussex Railroad (later known as the Sussex Branch of the Delaware, Lackawanna and Western Railroad) was a short-line railroad in northwestern New Jersey. It replaced its predecessor, the Sussex Mine Railroad, in 1853 and operated under the Sussex Railroad Company until 1945 when it was fully merged into the Delaware, Lackawanna and Western Railroad (DL&W) system. The Sussex Railroad was important in the economic development of Sussex County as it supplied a route for early local industries, such as dairy farms and ore mines, to export their products. It was the last independently operated New Jersey railroad to be incorporated into the DL&W system. The last train travelled on the Sussex Railroad tracks on October 2, 1966. The tracks were removed soon after and the right-of-way was transformed into a rail trail known as the Sussex Branch Trail.

== Sussex Mine Railroad ==
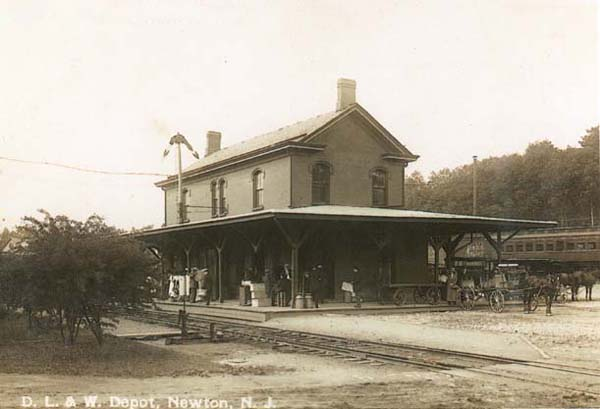
Newton station, built 1873, was one of the first stations

The Sussex Mine Railroad, chartered on March 9, 1848, was the predecessor of the Sussex Railroad that was to be used for the sole purpose of hauling iron ore from the recently re-opened Andover Mine. The 3 ft (914 mm) narrow gauge railway was drawn by mules from the Andover Mine down to the Morris Canal at Waterloo Village and was then taken on to the Thomas Iron Furnaces in Allentown, Pennsylvania. The Act by the New Jersey Legislature that incorporated the railroad also allowed for the provision of extending the rail into Newton, the county seat.

The initial 11 mi (18 km) of the Sussex Mine Railroad from the mine in Andover, which was named after the mine, was started in May 1849 and completed in August 1851. During construction of the railroad, the legislature approved a supplement to the charter on March 18, 1851, that allowed the railroad to extend the line to the Morris & Essex Railroad (M&E), which was extending its line to Hackettstown. The Sussex Mine Railroad struck a deal with the M&E that would work in their favor if they were to have the connection ready for operation by the time the M&E's extension reached Waterloo. In preparation for this extension and what eventually became a rebuilding of the entire existing line, the New Jersey Legislature approved another supplement to the charter on January 26, 1853, that allowed the company to change its name to the Sussex Railroad, reflecting its new purpose beyond just serving the mines and authorized the company to extend the track to any point in Sussex County on the Delaware River.

== Expansion (1853–1881) ==
The renamed Sussex Railroad Company gained support by issuing stock and bonds, which raised the necessary funds to lay the new track. Ground was broken on the 4 ft 10 in (1,473 mm) track gauge line from Newton to Waterloo on May 5, 1853. The company wanted to proceed quickly to meet the deadline for the agreement that, if met, would mean a substantial source of revenue. Because of this fast pace, steeper grades and tighter curves were adopted than might have been preferred otherwise. Work progressed quickly, even though the M&E was trying to slow down progress any way they could, including compensating employees of the Sussex Railroad to delay the necessary cuts south of Newton. To speed work along, the Sussex Railroad Company used employees of the Andover Mine temporarily on the railroad right-of-way. All of this effort paid off as they were successful in meeting the deadline. The new railroad was completed and the first train entered Newton on November 27, 1854, with traffic between Newton and Waterloo being opened on December 11, 1854. The M&E connected to the Sussex Railroad in January 1855, thus the financial agreement made earlier was upheld.

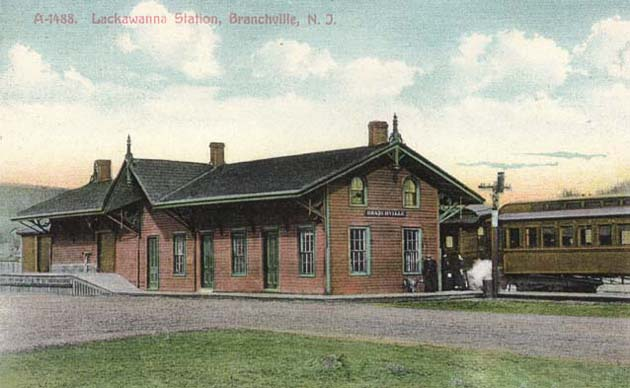
Branchville station, built in 1869

At this point, the only stations on the Sussex Railroad were at Newton, Andover, and Waterloo, but they served many industries and moved products such as produce, dairy, meat, and of course iron ore from the mines. Increased interest in the franklinite and iron and zinc ores from Franklin further northeast of Newton prompted the New Jersey Legislature to adopt another supplement on February 4, 1863, that authorized the railroad to continue its line up to the Franklin Furnace and to other points north if "deemed most for the public good."

Expansion came swiftly with ground breaking on a ten-mile (16 km) extension line north of Newton through Lafayette and Augusta to Branchville in 1866, around the same time that the track gauge was adjusted to 4 ft 8 1/2 in (1,435 mm) standard gauge. to align with the M&E tracks. This branch would allow for an outlet for Sussex County's northern agricultural products and staged the potential future expansion of the line through Culver's Gap to the Delaware River. The first train to run on the Branchville extension went as far as Lafayette on January 1, 1869, as work continued further up the line; the entire Branchville line was completed on July 3, 1869.

At the same time as work was being done on the Branchville line, pressure was increasing to bring rail to the ever-increasing mining industries of Franklin, including the New Jersey Zinc Company. Work finally began on this nine-mile (14 km)) extension in 1868, after a very heated debate and political power plays that could have routed traffic around Newton entirely. But residents of Newton rejected any plan to leave their town off the main line of traffic and insisted that the extension to Franklin be built north of Newton. The Franklin line opened to regular service in mid-September 1869. Additionally, an unconnected four-mile (6.4 km) spur known as the South Vernon extension, which ran from Hamburg to McAfee, was completed in 1871 and allowed access to an iron ore mine at the base of the Pochuck mountain range via trackage rights on the New Jersey Midland Railway. This represented the height of track building on the Sussex Railroad.

In the 1870s, depots at Franklin, McAfee, Lafayette were completed and a new depot at Newton was constructed. Some other platforms used for local agricultural industries were also completed at Sparta Junction and Monroe. The 1870s also saw another supplement to the charter allowing the railroad to extend rail to Stanhope for an easier connection with the M&E tracks, though the track wasn't laid until 1901. Notably, in 1879, steel tracks replaced iron for the first time on the Sussex Railroad.

This was to be the height of the Sussex Railroad. A little over a decade after the extensions had all been completed, the South Vernon extension was sold off to the Lehigh & Hudson River Railway (L&HR) on July 6, 1881, and the McAfee station was closed in May 1881. L&HR was also trying to buy a controlling interest in the Sussex Railroad Company, but the DL&W, which had already leased the M&E line that connected to the Sussex Railroad, bought the controlling interest on July 27, 1881. The Sussex Railroad was the last independently operated New Jersey railroad to be acquired by DL&W.

== DL&W (1881–1945) ==
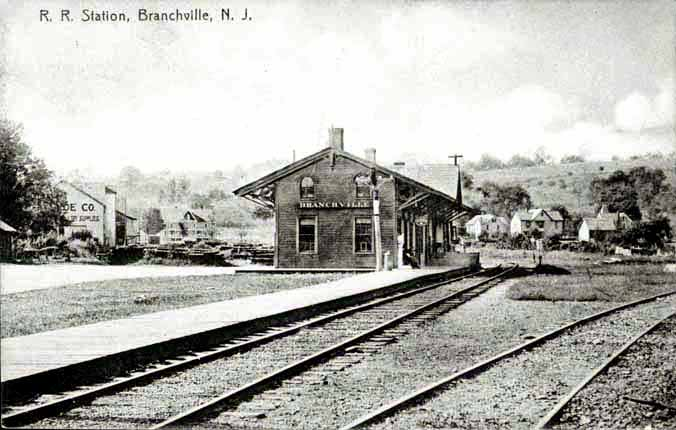
Branchville station, c. 1917

The Sussex Railroad, operating under the DL&W as the Sussex Branch, began its slow, early decline in the late 19th century, owing to the discovery of better ore elsewhere in the country. Many industries and mines began to close in Sussex County, including the blast furnace in Franklin that shut down in 1900. Still, there was some expansion: A new station was added at Cranberry Lake, which became a country getaway and weekend vacation spot for residents, and the Netcong-Stanhope Cutoff was completed in 1900, prompting the abandonment of the line to Waterloo.

As industry began to decrease in the area, the rise of the automobile and trucking took away valuable passenger and freight business from the Sussex Branch. As the area suffered during the Great Depression, so did the railroad. Permission was granted by the Public Utilities Commission to discontinue service to Franklin on February 23, 1932, with total abandonment of the Franklin branch being approved by the Interstate Commerce Commission on May 26, 1934. The remaining line was that of the 21-mile (34 km) Branchville to Stanhope line. By 1945, the Sussex Railroad ceased to exist and the company was finally fully merged into the DL&W.

== End of service (1945–present) ==
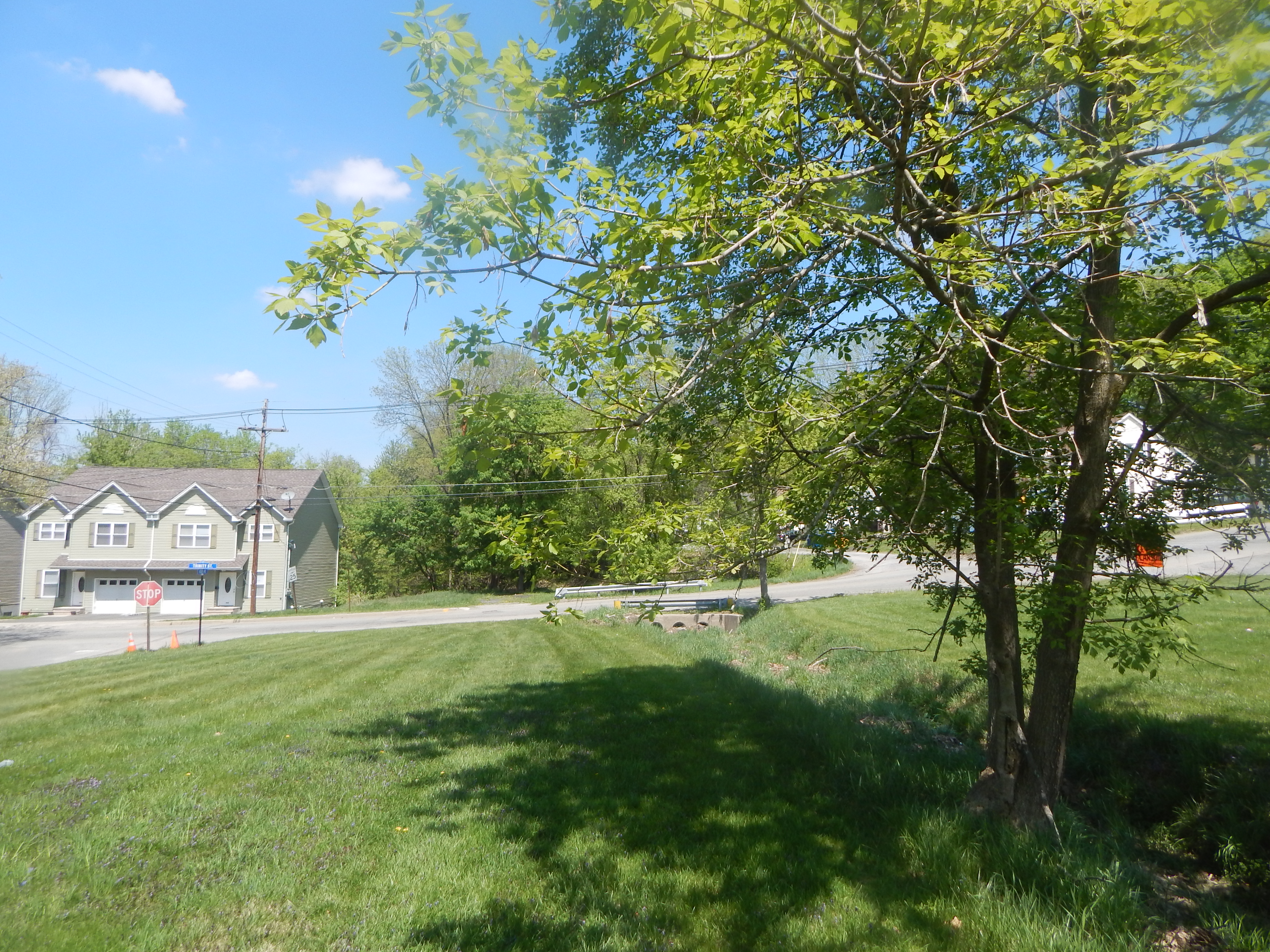
Newton station site in May 2015

The downward trend continued, with the 1950s seeing more industries served by the railroad go out of business. By 1959, mail service via the Sussex Branch ceased, and the final milk train ran in November 1964. The last passenger train departed from Branchville on July 10, 1966; the last passenger train from Newton on July 13, 1966; and the last passenger train on the entire branch departed Andover on October 2, 1966. By 1969, all track formerly owned by the Sussex Railroad was out of service, with the exception of the former South Vernon extension currently used by the New York, Susquehanna & Western Railway on its way to Syracuse and Utica, New York.

After abandonment, buildings deteriorated and track was dismantled. The Newton passenger depot was demolished in November 1970. The final stretch of track between Andover and Stanhope/Netcong was removed in July 1977.

The roadbed for the Sussex Branch has mostly been preserved, however. The earliest purchase of a former right-of-way occurred in 1938 when Sussex County bought the former Franklin branch after service was discontinued. After all service ceased on the line, the state preserved the remainder of the line in the form of the Sussex Branch Trail, a division of the Kittatinny Valley State Park system. The trail stretches from Stanhope up to Branchville with only minor interruptions from privately owned sections.

== Station list ==
All mileposts are from Hoboken Terminal.

County	Milepost	Station	Opened	Rebuilt	Closed	Notes
Morris	48.00	Netcong-Stanhope	1853	June 14, 1903		Replaced for construction of the Stanhope Cut-Off. Maintained by New Jersey Transit for their Montclair-Boonton Line and Morristown Line.
Sussex	52.81	Cranberry Lake	1898			
Sussex	55.18	Andover	December 11, 1854		October 2, 1966	The station depot was purchased in 1958 and moved to 31 Lenape Road in Andover.
Sussex	60.00	Newton	December 11, 1854	1873	July 13, 1966	Station depot was demolished in 1970.
Sussex	64.70	Lafayette	January 1, 1869	1873, 1948	July 10, 1966	Station depot was demolished in 1948 and was replaced by a small shelter through the end of passenger service in 1966.
Sussex	67.80	Augusta	April 1, 1891		Before 1966	Connections were available with the Lehigh and New England Railway.
Sussex	69.50	Branchville	January 1, 1869		July 10, 1966	The station depot remained standing until January 22, 1994, when the depot's roof collapsed under snow. The building was razed over the next couple weeks.

== See also ==
- Mine railway
