= Oxford Tunnel =

Defunct U.S. railway tunnel in New Jersey

Coordinates: 40°48′N 74°59′W

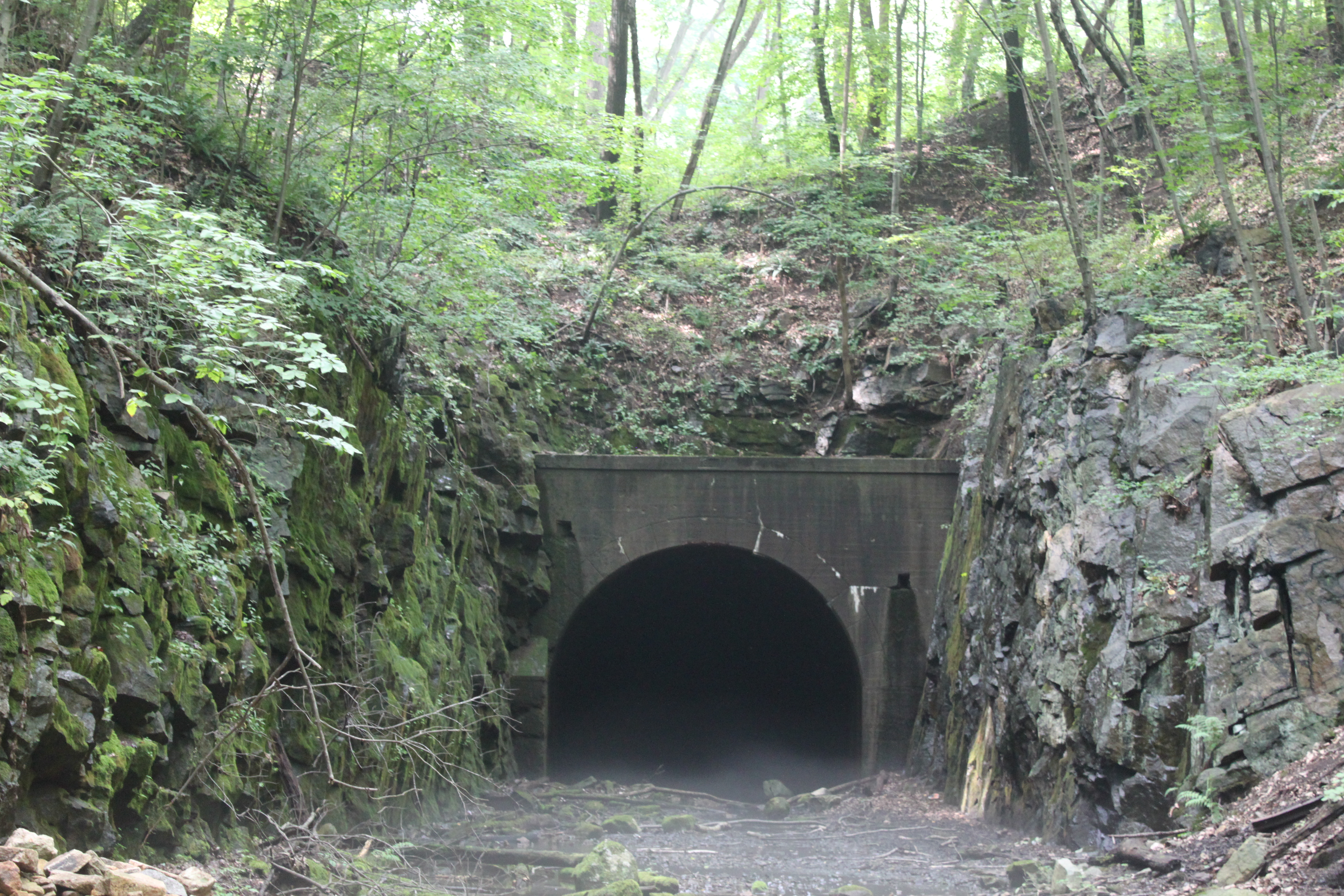
The eastern portal of Oxford Tunnel on the Old Road in August 2011.

The Oxford Tunnel, also known as the Van Nest Gap Tunnel, was one of seven tunnels built to complete the Warren Railroad, which formed part of Lackawanna Railroad's 400-mile mainline. The tunnel was completed in 1862, and was retrofitted with a gauntlet track by 1900.

== History ==
The completion of the tunnel was delayed due to inconsistent funding, American Civil War-era technology, and issues with digging through gneiss. The construction of the Warren Railroad required the completion of three bridges, two tunnels (the other tunnel being at Manuka Chuck), and cuts and fills.

The tunnel was completed in September 1862. Later on, as train cars became larger, it became impossible to allow two tracks to fit through the tunnel. To address the issue, by 1900, a gauntlet track, which permits two tracks that closely overlap to pass through the tunnel together, was installed. The gauntlet track maximized the overhead and side clearances in the tunnel, but restricted the tunnel to a single-track section, creating a bottleneck on the line. In the end, the building of the Lackawanna Cut-Off would be the only solution that worked. In August 2018 there was a second major collapse in the tunnel. While still passable it is not without significant risk.
