= Warren Railroad =

Former U.S. railway line in New Jersey

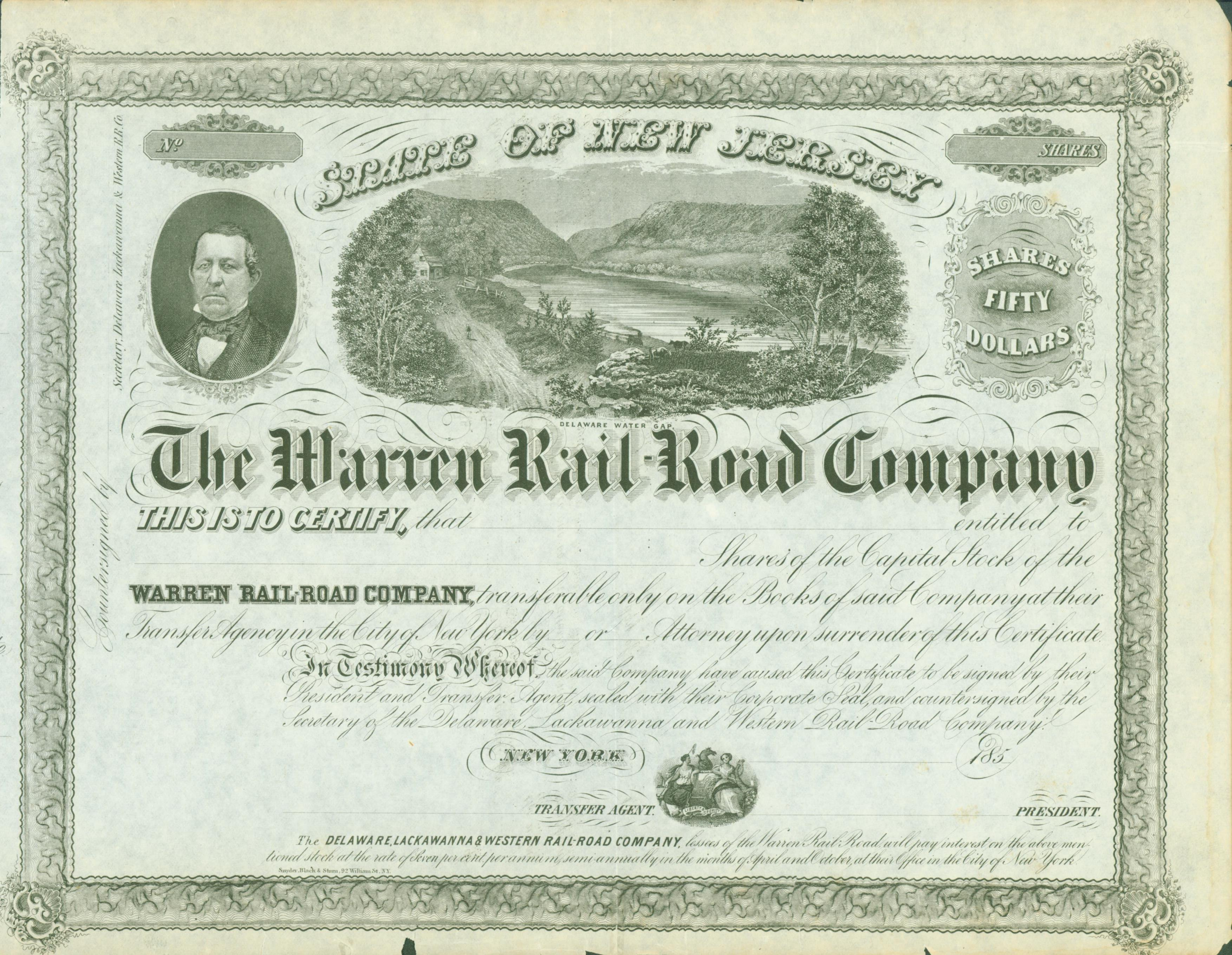
- Share of the Warren Rail-Road Company, unissued, vignette with the Delaware Water Gap

Overview
- Locale: Warren County, New Jersey
- Dates of operation: 1851–1945
- Successor: Delaware, Lackawanna and Western Railroad

Technical
- Track gauge: 1,435 mm (4 ft 8 1/2 in)
- Previous gauge: 6 ft (1,829 mm)
- Length: 18.827 mi (30.299 km)

The Warren Railroad was a railroad in Warren County, New Jersey, that served as part of the Delaware, Lackawanna and Western Railroad's mainline from 1856 to 1911.

== History ==
The Warren Railroad was chartered on February 12, 1851, by special act of the state of New Jersey, to provide a connection from the Delaware, Lackawanna & Western Railroad's (DL&W) terminus at the Delaware River to Hampton, New Jersey, on the Central Railroad of New Jersey (CNJ), in anticipation of a merger between the two railroads. The railroad's date of organization was March 4, 1853, and construction began that June.

Terrain made the Warren expensive to build, requiring a large amount of excavation, three large bridges, and two tunnels.

DL&W began operating on the railway on May 28, 1856, from Delaware, New Jersey, to Hampton, and continuing over CNJ to Jersey City. DL&W formally leased the Warren Railroad in October 1857.

The tracks were originally 6 ft (1,829 mm) gauge, continuous with the DL&W's Pennsylvania tracks. A third rail was added to CNJ's 4 ft 8 1/2 in (1,435 mm) standard gauge track.

When the railroad opened in 1856, the Van Nest Gap Tunnel was not yet completed, and a temporary track was used. The tunnel was completed in September 1862, and the temporary track removed.

Merger talks between the DL&W and CNJ broke down and on December 10, 1868, the DL&W signed a lease for the Morris & Essex Railroad (M&E), effective January 1, 1869. The DL&W then shifted their mainline off of CNJ to the M&E with a new junction at Washington, New Jersey. While the Warren Railroad was straight from the DL&W's former terminus at the Delaware River to the CNJ, its route to the M&E was circuitous. Additionally, the section between the Washington and Hampton (later called the Hampton Branch) was deemed useless.

The M&E was originally built to a gauge of 4 ft 10 in (1,473 mm), but was converted to 4 ft 8 1/2 in (1,435 mm) in July 1866. After the DL&W lease, a third rail was added for 66 miles (106 km) from Washington eastward to Hoboken from 1869-1870. DL&W's tracks from Scranton to Washington were converted to 4 ft 8 1/2 in (1,435 mm) on May 27, 1876. The unused third rail on the M&E was subsequently removed.

The Lackawanna Cut-Off was built to minimize grades and curves, and to avoid the operational problems of the Warren Railroad. The Cut-Off was completed in 1911, becoming the new mainline of the DL&W. This relegated the Warren Railroad and the M&E line west of Port Morris Junction to a branch line known as the Lackawanna Old Road, starting the railroad's decline.

In 1945, DL&W officially bought the Warren Railroad. In 1955 revenue freight service ended on the Hampton Branch; the last train to operate on the line was a work train in 1956. The line was officially abandoned in 1958. The grand Changewater truss bridge and Route 31 bridge in Hampton were removed in April 1959. Trackage remained intact until 1963 when Erie Lackawanna removed all of it.

Hurricane Diane caused extensive damage to the line at Delaware and Manunka Chunk in 1955. The PRR junction was soon abandoned. The Old Road Branch was then single tracked from Washington to Delaware.

Storm damage in 1968 near Oxford, New Jersey, led to the railroad's demise. All remaining trackage was removed by April 1970 between Washington and Delaware. Track remained in Delaware for some time after the line south to Washington was torn up because it was needed for coal train back ups from the Portland power plant. Track was later shortened to the truss bridge over the Delaware River by 1980. Until about 15 years ago, coal trains still backed out on the truss bridge.

== Connections ==
Two connections from other railroads were made to the Warren Railroad.

The Blairstown Railway opened in 1877, from a connection to the Warren Railroad in Delaware to Blairstown. While the Blairstown Railway was a partial thoroughfare for the New York, Susquehanna & Western Railroad and the Lehigh & New England Railroad, the section from Delaware to Hainesburg was just a vestigial branch line known as the Delaware Branch, which was abandoned in 1928.

The Belvidere Delaware Railroad (Bel Del) was extended north from Belvidere, New Jersey, to form a junction with the Warren Railroad at Manunka Chunk, which opened on May 16, 1864. The Pennsylvania Railroad operated to East Stroudsburg, Pennsylvania, via trackage rights. Passenger service ceased in 1952, and the tracks north of Belvidere to the junction were washed out by Hurricane Diane in 1955.

The Lehigh and Hudson River Railway crossed beneath the Warren Railroad south of Bridgeville, without an interchange.
