= Washington Secondary =

Freight railway line in New Jersey, United States

Overview
- Owner: Norfolk Southern Railway

History
- Opened: 1866

Technical
- Line length: 23.4 mi (37.7 km)
- Track gauge: 1,435 mm (4 ft 8 1/2 in) standard gauge

The Washington Secondary is a freight-only railway line in the state of New Jersey. It runs 24.3 miles (39.1 km) from Phillipsburg, New Jersey, to Hackettstown, New Jersey. It forms a connection between the Lehigh Line and Morristown Line.

== History ==
The modern Washington Secondary incorporates the western end of the former main line of the Morris and Essex Railroad. The Morris and Essex Railroad was incorporated in 1835, and began operating between Newark and Morristown in 1838. The line reached Hackettstown in 1854. The extension from Hackettstown to Phillipsburg opened in 1866. The Delaware, Lackawanna and Western Railroad leased the Morris and Essex on January 1, 1869.

Under the Lackawanna, the section between Hackettstown and Washington was incorporated into the main line between Hoboken, New Jersey, and Buffalo, New York, while the western part between Washington and Phillipsburg was known as the Phillipsburg branch. The Lackawanna completed the Lackawanna Cut-Off in 1911, bypassing the original main line in New Jersey and shortening the route between Port Morris Junction and Slateford Junction by 11 miles (18 km). The superseded line became known as the Lackawanna Old Road.

The Lackawanna and the Erie Railroad merged in 1960 to become the Erie Lackawanna Railroad (later the Erie Lackawanna Railway). Both lines were conveyed to Conrail in 1976 on the bankruptcy of the Erie Lackawanna; the line east of Washington was known as the Washington Line at this time. In 1994, NJ Transit extended Boonton Line service from Netcong to Hackettstown. NJ Transit leased that portion of the Washington Secondary from Conrail at that time. When Conrail was split between CSX Transportation and the Norfolk Southern Railway in 1999, the Washington Secondary was conveyed to Norfolk Southern. NJ Transit acquired the Hackettstown–Netcong segment from Norfolk Southern in 2023, truncating the Washington Secondary to Phillipsburg–Hackettstown.
