= Lackawanna Old Road =

Former U.S. railway line

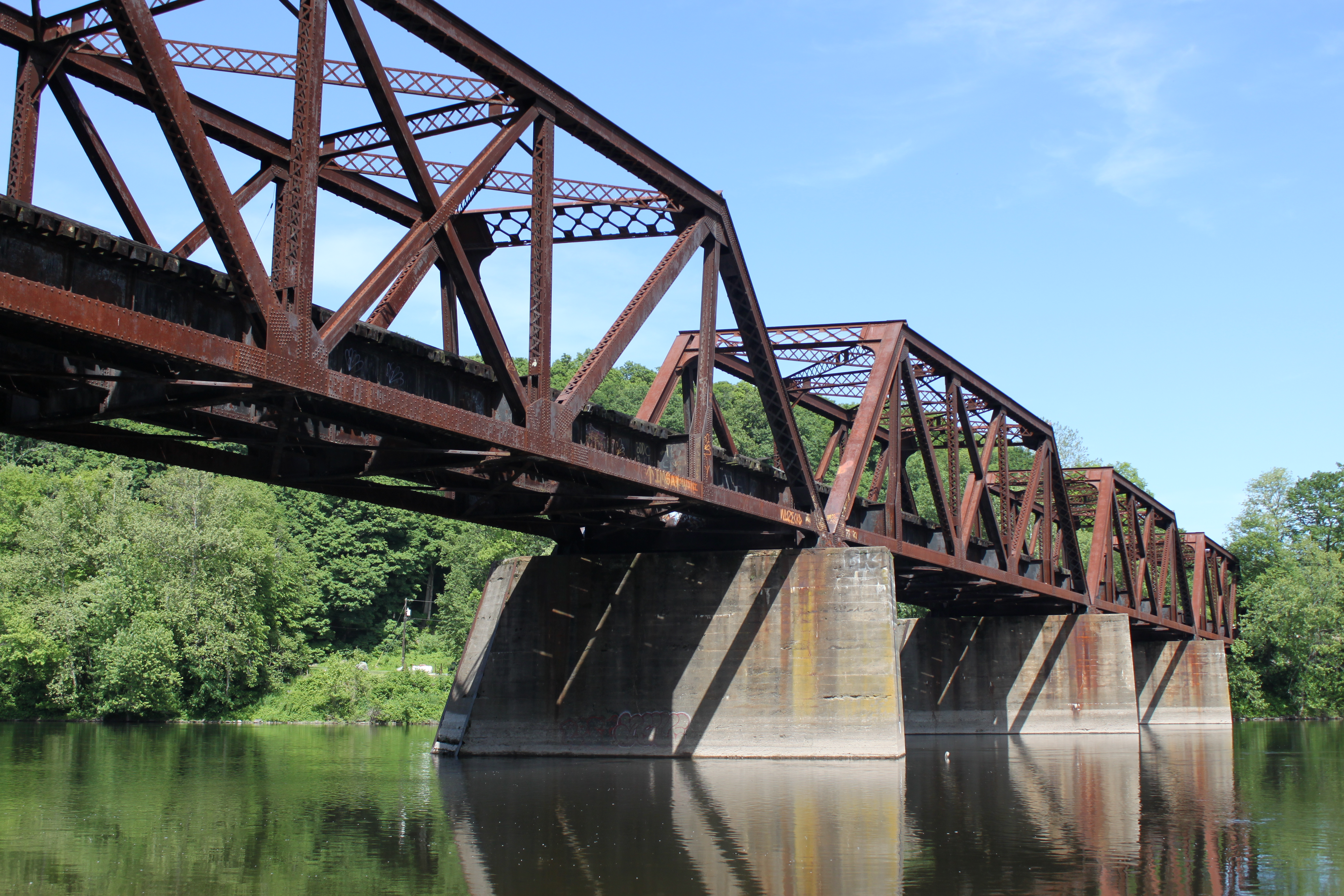
- Old Road bridge (built 1902) spanning the Delaware River, Delaware, New Jersey

Overview
- Termini: Port Morris Junction; Slateford Junction

History
- Opened: 1856
- Closed: 1970

Technical
- Line length: 39.6 mi (63.7 km)
- Track gauge: 1,435 mm (4 ft 8 1/2 in) standard gauge
- Operating speed: 70 mph (110 km/h)

The Lackawanna Old Road was part of the original mainline of the Delaware, Lackawanna & Western Railroad (DL&W). Opened in 1856, it was, for a half-century, a part of the line connecting the states of New Jersey and Pennsylvania.

In 1911, the DL&W cut 11 miles (18 km) off the route by opening the Lackawanna Cut-Off, which branched off from existing track at the new Port Morris Junction and Slateford Junction. The 39.6-mile (63.7 km) stretch of existing track between these junctions was relegated to secondary status and became known as the "Old Road".

== History ==
The Old Road involves one railroad tycoon (John I. Blair) and four railroads: the DL&W, the Jersey Central (CNJ), the Morris & Essex Railroad (M&E), and the Warren Railroad.

In 1853, construction began on the 19-mile (31 km) Warren Railroad, which would connect the CNJ at Hampton, New Jersey, and the DL&W's mainline at the Delaware River, in anticipation of an eventual merger between the two older railroads. Expensive to build, the Warren required three large bridges, two tunnels, and much excavation before it opened in 1856.

In 1862, Oxford Tunnel (also known as Van Nest Gap Tunnel) opened, relieving trains of a slow and arduous climb over Van Nest Gap. The new tunnel, however, did not prevent the collapse of the planned DL&W-CNJ merger.

The M&E quickly emerged as the logical replacement for the CNJ, as it would give the DL&W direct access to the Hudson River. But this time, there would be no bespoke connecting line between the merger partners. Instead, the DL&W forged a circuitous route out of existing lines, including 20 miles (32 km) of the Phillipsburg Branch (Port Morris to Washington, New Jersey); 14 miles (23 km) of the Warren Railroad (Washington to Delaware, New Jersey); and 5 miles (8 km) of the Bangor & Portland Railroad (Delaware, to Slateford, Pennsylvania). The speed limits on the sections varied: 70 mph (110 km/h) on the Phillipsburg Branch; and 50 mph (80 km/h) on the Warren Railroad and B&P.

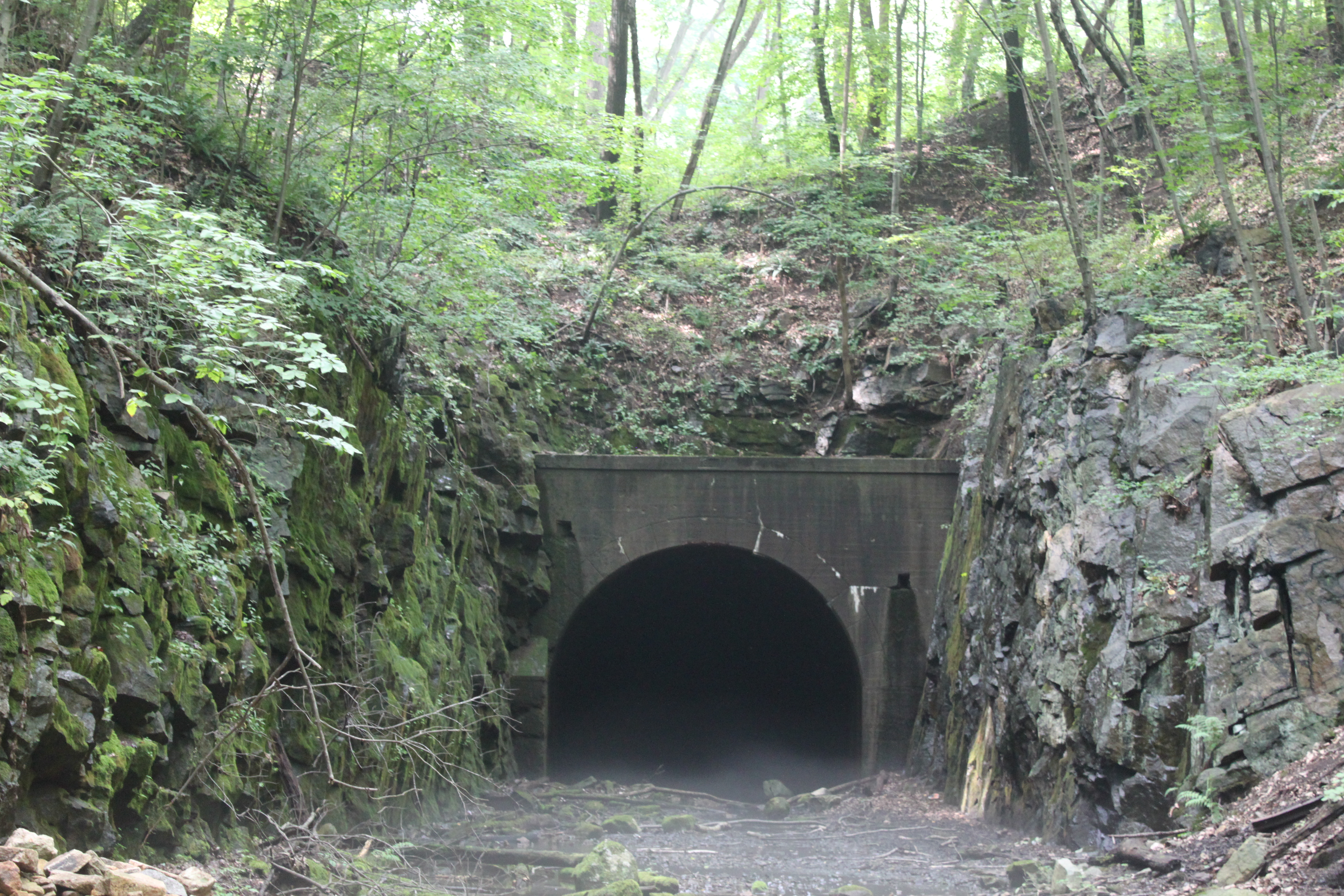
Oxford Tunnel's eastern portal, August 2011; low clearances and increasing traffic forced the railroad to install gauntlet track, creating a bottleneck eliminated by building the Lackawanna Cut-Off

Oxford Tunnel was double-tracked in 1869, and for a few decades, suffered no more serious problems than the intermittent water (and sometimes flooding) also seen in its sister tunnel at Manunka Chunk. By the 1890s, the era's larger locomotives and rolling stock had trouble fitting through the tunnel. In 1901, the railroad installed gauntlet track in the tunnel, effectively turning it into a single-track bottleneck — another reason to build the Lackawanna Cut-Off.

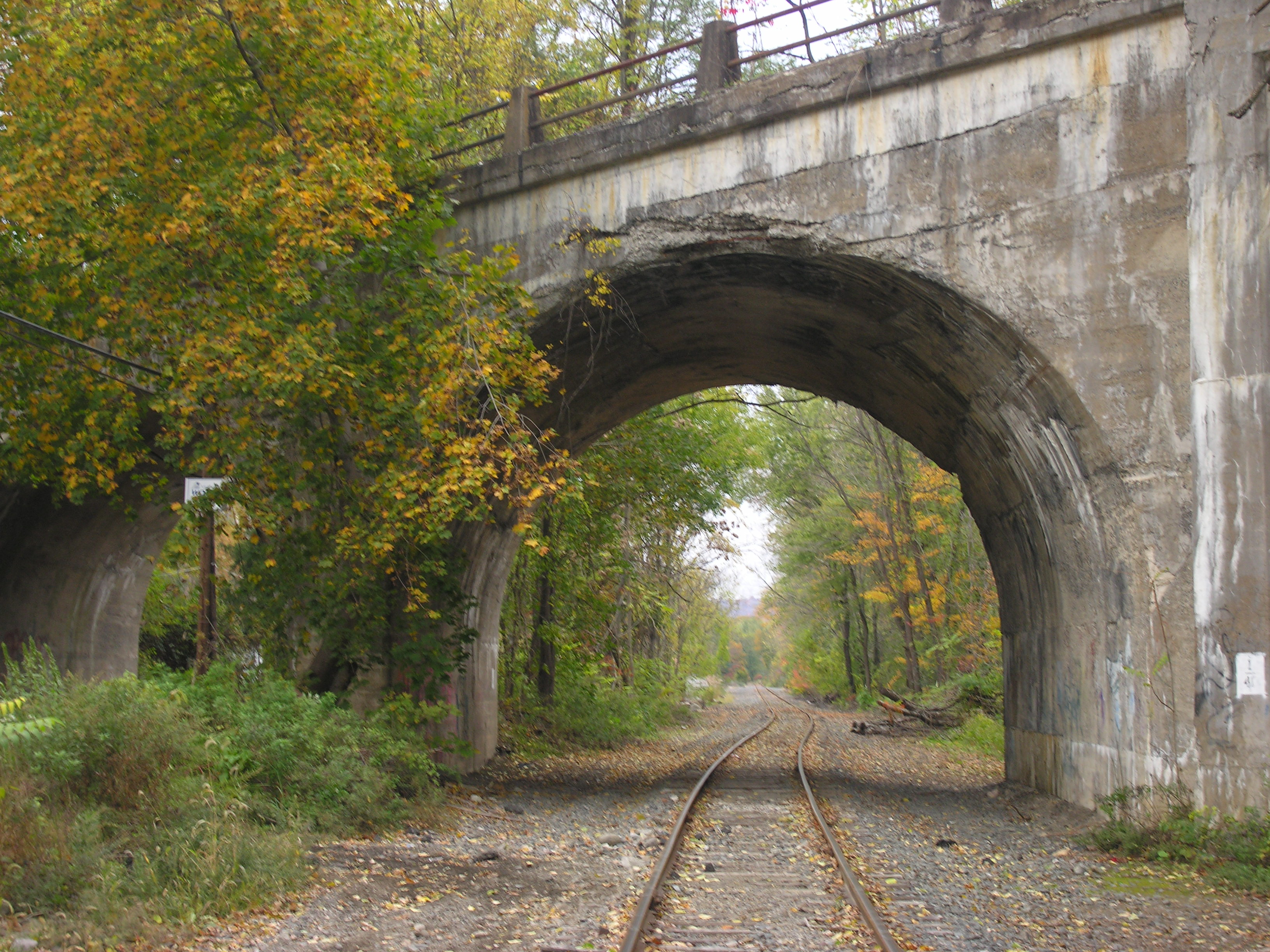
Old Road beneath the Delaware River Viaduct near Slateford, Pennsylvania

With the opening of the Cut-Off in 1911, the line became known as the Old Road, relegated to a branch line for local freight shipments. It still saw the occasional through train when Cut-Off traffic was heavy and served as the main line in 1941 when a rockslide closed the Cut-Off.

The effects of Hurricane Diane caused record flooding along the Delaware River and forced DL&W to reroute trains over part the Old Road. The storm also washed out the Pennsylvania Railroad (PRR) Bel-Del Railroad north of Belvidere, New Jersey, leading the railroad to remove the section north to the junction of the Old Road at Manunka Chunk and end PRR service from Trenton, New Jersey, to East Stroudsburg, Pennsylvania.

=== Rockport wreck ===
The Old Road was the site of the DL&W's most infamous train wreck. On June 16, 1925, a passenger train carrying German-American tourists from Chicago to Hoboken was slated to run over the Cut-Off, but in order to avoid freight trains on the line the special train was diverted onto the Old Road to Port Morris. At Rockport, New Jersey, the train struck debris washed onto a road crossing by a heavy thunderstorm. The train derailed, and killed 47 passengers and three trainmen.

In 1995, on the 70th anniversary of the wreck, a stone and plaque was erected at the Rockport crossing to remember the lives lost.

=== Decline ===
In April 1970, the Erie Lackawanna Railway (EL) abandoned the Delaware-Washington, New Jersey section. Conrail assumed EL operations in 1976. In 1982, NJ Transit assumed operation of the trackage between Port Morris Junction and Netcong for commuter service.

Port Morris Junction ceased to exist in 1984 when Conrail abandoned the Cut-Off. Warren County removed remaining bridges and abutments over the next several years. Now that the Lackawanna Cut-Off Restoration Project is underway, Port Morris Junction is the connection point of the "Old Road" and the "Cut-Off" once again since 2011.

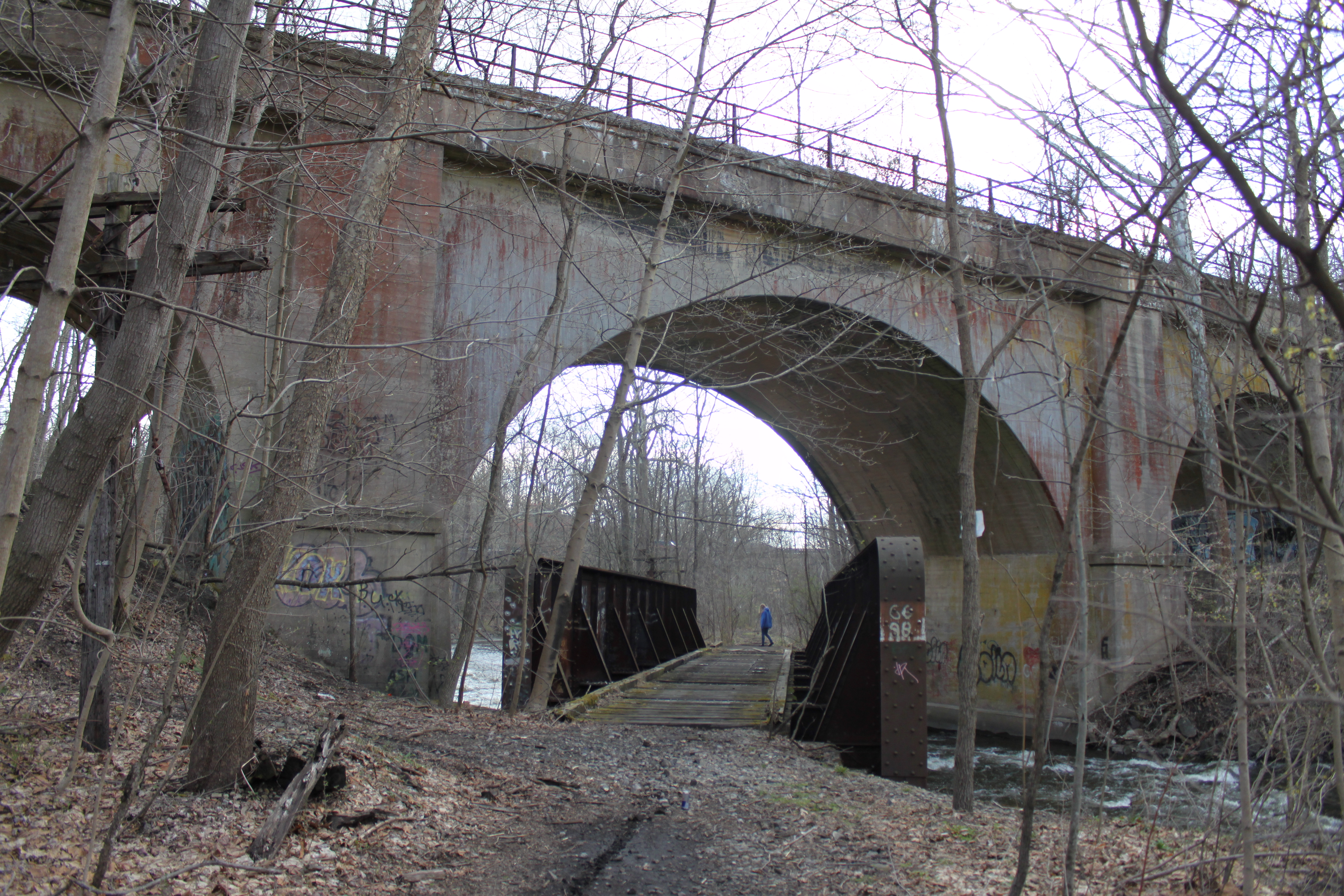
Buttzville, New Jersey bridge, 1901, one of the DL&W's first concrete bridges and the only one to cross a river (the Pequest River) and railroad (the L&HR RR) with a single arch

Some vestiges of the Warren Railroad remain: telegraph poles, tunnels, and a concrete viaduct spanning the Pequest River and the abandoned Lehigh and Hudson River Railway right-of-way near the intersection of State Route 31 and U.S. Route 46 near Buttzville. The steel bridge across the Delaware River near Delaware, N.J., retains the eastbound track but is no longer in use.

In October 1994, commuter rail service was re-established to Hackettstown by NJ Transit, although the operation west of Netcong was under trackage rights granted by Conrail and then later Norfolk Southern Railway.

In 2011, Port Morris Junction was re-established to serve the Lackawanna Cut-Off Restoration Project.
