= Lehigh and Hudson River Railway =

Former U.S. Class 1 railway

- L&HR system map

Overview
- Headquarters: Warwick, New York
- Reporting mark: LHR
- Locale: New Jersey; Pennsylvania; New York
- Dates of operation: 1882–1976
- Successor: Conrail now Norfolk Southern and CSX

Technical
- Track gauge: 4 ft 8 1/2 in (1,435 mm) standard gauge
- Length: 97 miles (156 kilometres)

The Lehigh and Hudson River Railway (L&HR) was the smallest of the six railroads that were merged into Conrail in 1976. It was a bridge line running northeast–southwest across northwestern New Jersey, connecting the line to the Poughkeepsie Bridge at Maybrook, New York, with Easton, Pennsylvania, where it interchanged with various other companies.

== History ==
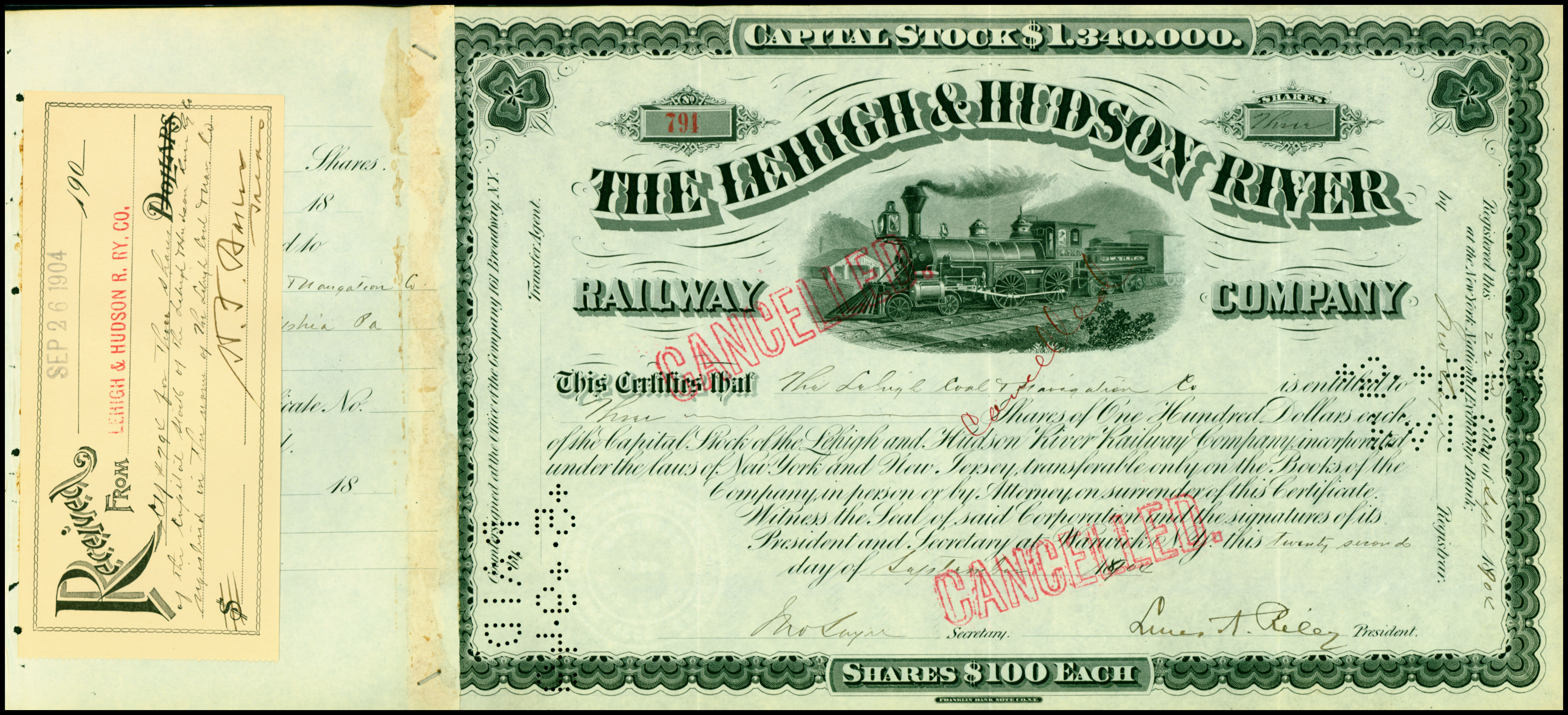
Share of the Lehigh & Hudson River RW Company, issued 22. September 1904

The roots of the L&HR begin with the founding of the Warwick Valley Railroad. The Warwick Valley Railroad was organized March 8, 1860, by a group of local dairymen and business owners led by Grinnell Burt (1822–1901) as a means of connecting the mainline of the New York and Erie Rail Road at Greycourt, New York, southwest to Warwick, New York. It opened in 1862 and was operated as a branch of the broad-gauged Erie.

The Pequest and Wallkill Railroad was chartered by 1870 to build an extension in New Jersey, running from Belvidere on the Delaware River and Belvidere Delaware Railroad northeast to the New York state line. The Lehigh and Hudson River Railroad was chartered later as a competitor, planning to build from Belvidere to McAfee, with the Wawayanda Railroad running the rest of the way to the state line and to a connection with the Warwick Valley Railroad.

In April/May 1881, the three companies merged to form a new Lehigh and Hudson River Railroad and on April 1, 1882, the Warwick Valley Railroad joined, forming the Lehigh and Hudson River Railway (L&HR). Grinnell Burt would serve as the president of the newly consolidated line, as he had with the WVRR, up until his death in 1901 and would be instrumental in progressing the L&HR to become a "link in a great chain" of transportation in the northeast.

Train wreck near Greycourt, at the Hudson Junction water tower, involving Engines #24 & 60, July 3, 1913. Locomotive 24 was returning from Maybrook after delivering the Federal Express to the CNE Railroad at Maybrook when it side-swiped #60 at Hudson Jct. Nobody was killed in the wreck

In the meantime, the Sussex Railroad had built a branch from Hamburg to South Vernon (McAfee); the L&HR bought this around 1881. The Warwick Valley Railroad had built an extension southwest to McAfee in March 1880, and the full line opened August 14, 1882, connecting Belvidere, New Jersey, to Greycourt, New York.

For several years, the L&HR carried freight from its western connections to Greycourt where the Erie operated a branch to the car floats at Newburgh, New York. These car floats across the Hudson River served as a vital rail link to New England. However, by the 1880s this line was already being made obsolete by the planned construction of the Poughkeepsie Bridge and an all-rail route across the Hudson. Sensing the opportunity, the Orange County Railroad was chartered as an L&HR line on November 28, 1888, and opened the following year, extending the line northeast from Greycourt to Burnside where Trackage rights were obtained over a short piece of the New York, Ontario and Western Railway from the junction at Burnside west to the major junction at Campbell Hall. Shortly thereafter, the line was extended further north to Maybrook. At Maybrook, the line junctioned with the Central New England Railway, who would build an enormous staging yard for trains continuing east via the Poughkeepsie Bridge over the Hudson River to New England.

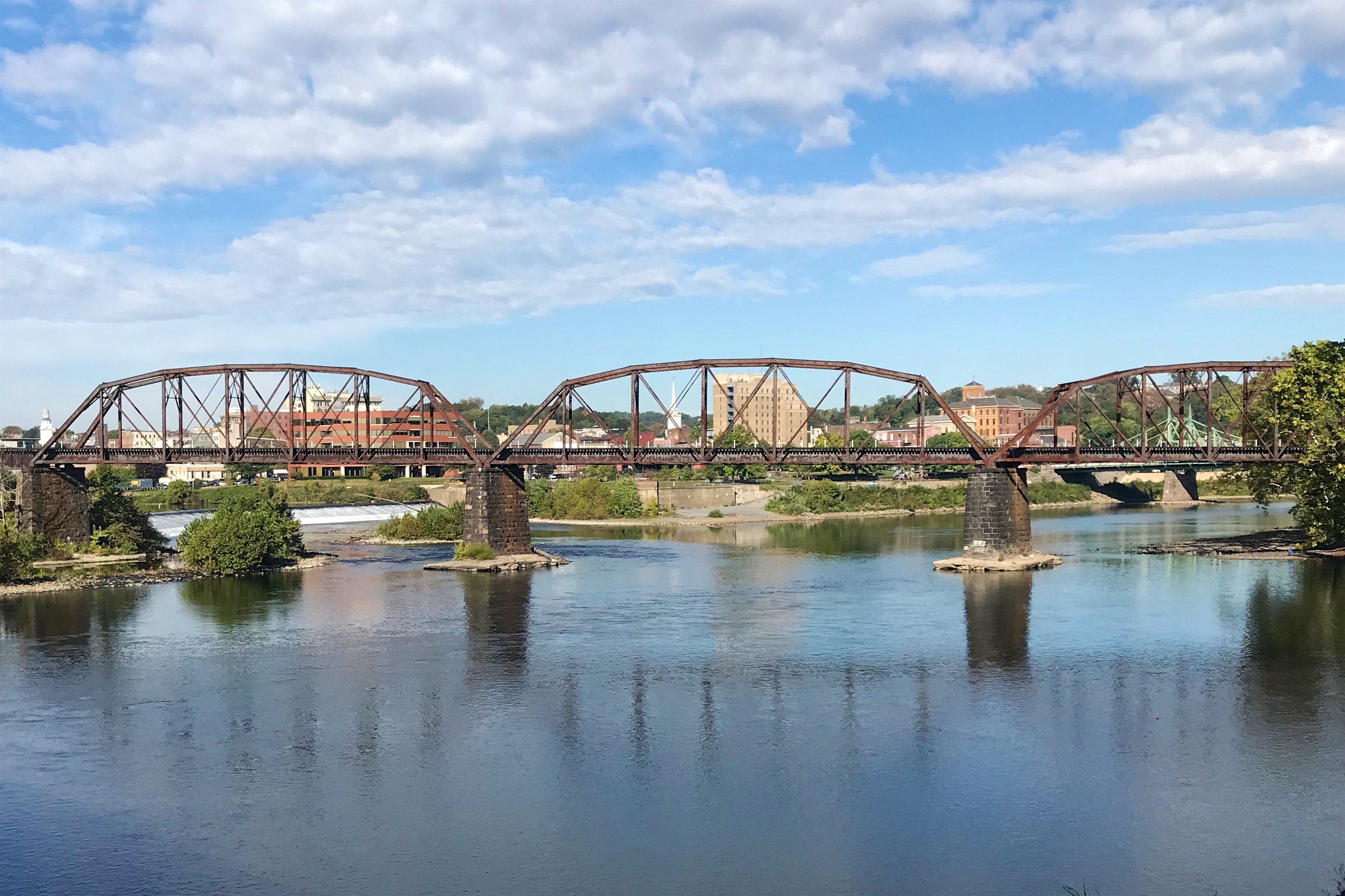
Bridge over the Delaware River between Easton and Phillipsburg

The South Easton and Phillipsburg Railroad of New Jersey, and the South Easton and Phillipsburg Railroad of Pennsylvania was organized on July 25, 1889, to build a bridge over the Delaware River between Easton, Pennsylvania, and Phillipsburg, New Jersey. The former built 460' on the New Jersey side, while the latter built 850' on the Pennsylvania side. Bridge construction began on November 19, 1889, and concluded the following year on October 2. "The South Easton and Phillipsburg Railroad of New Jersey and South Easton and Phillipsburg of Pennsylvania were consolidated with the Lehigh and Hudson River Railway on April 2, 1912. Subsequently, the L&HR obtained trackage rights over 13 miles of the Pennsylvania Railroad's (PRR) Belvidere Delaware Railroad between Phillipsburg and Belvidere; once the bridge was completed, the L&HR had a continuous line from Maybrook to Easton. At Easton, an interchange could be made with the Central Railroad of New Jersey and Lehigh Valley Railroad, while interchange with the PRR was at Phillipsburg.

In 1905, the L&HR eventually obtained trackage rights over the Delaware, Lackawanna and Western Railroad's (DL&W) Sussex Railroad from the junction at Andover south to Port Morris, where it interchanged with the main line of the DL&W.

The Mine Hill Railroad was the only branch built. It ran south from a junction at Franklin, New Jersey, to the mines of the New Jersey Zinc Company at Sterling Hill, New Jersey.

Revenue freight traffic, in millions of net ton-miles
Year	Traffic
1925	373
1933	183
1944	418
1960	274
1967	404

From October 1912 until January 1916, the L&HR hosted the PRR's Federal Express passenger trains on the Poughkeepsie Bridge Route between Phillipsburg and Maybrook. With the completion of the Hell Gate Bridge in New York City on September 9, 1917, the Federal Express resumed service via Penn Station and the New Haven Line direct.

== Operations ==
At its peak, L&HR stretched 72 miles between Belvidere and Maybrook with trackage rights on the PRR's Belvidere Delaware Railroad from Belvidere to Phillipsburg, New Jersey, across its own bridge over the Delaware River to Easton, Pennsylvania, thence via trackage rights over the CNJ to their Allentown yards.

The main purpose of the L&HR was to act as an extremely important "bridge line" forwarding traffic from the coal and manufacturing regions to New England via the Poughkeepsie Railroad Bridge. Because nearly 100% of its ownership stake was split between the larger railroads that the line interchanged with, and with none having a controlling interest, the L&HR could rely on steady business forwarding this freight while maintaining independent control. The railroad ran almost exclusively through trains between Allentown and Maybrook with some exceptions. As the L&HR was built along a length of the Great Appalachian Valley, grades were relatively mild and long flat stretches of rail made speeds of over 60 mph common. The L&HR was an extremely efficient operation and it was possible to make the full run in less than 3 1/2 hours. With the exception of a short portion of double-track at Belvidere, the entire line was single-tracked with occasional passing sidings every 5–10 miles to handle the high volume of trains. Due to this streamlined operation, trains out of Allentown ran directly to Maybrook without having to be switched or otherwise handled as almost of the freight was destined to the Poughkeepsie Bridge and New England. Trains destined to Allentown would have to be re-blocked in Warwick for the connecting carriers such as the DL&W, LV, Reading, and PRR. The DL&W interchange at Port Morris via trackage rights on the Sussex Branch at Andover Jct. proved to be incredibly important and a source of much of the L&HR's business.

Online business, once the very impetus for the original construction of the Warwick Valley Railroad, became increasingly over time, a much smaller part of the L&HR's business and operations. With a few exceptions, there were no major online heavy industries besides the dozens of creameries and ice houses that dotted the line along its entire length. The dairy industry was especially strong in Warren, Sussex, and Orange Counties where the L&HR serviced numerous farming communities and forwarded their products to the interchange with the Erie and Greycourt where they would then be sent to market in New York City. As trucks began to replace rail as the preferred method of shipping for dairy products, this business all but dried up by the late 1930s. The L&HR was also an important supplier of coal for these communities serving as a link to the anthracite mining regions of Pennsylvania via their connections with the DL&W and CNJ. However, when home heating oil began to replace coal as the primary method to heat homes, the L&HR ceased not only local coal deliveries, but saw a reduction in the volume of coal cars destined for New England via Maybrook.

There were several Limestone quarries and gravel pits along the line in New Jersey including at Limecrest and McAfee, but the largest online customer was the New Jersey Zinc Company at Franklin, New Jersey. Zinc ore was a major source of revenue and carloads of zinc would be sent via the L&HR to the massive Zinc mills at Palmerton, Pennsylvania. The mine was so large in fact that Franklin was once home to three railroads; the L&HR, NYS&W until 1958, and the DL&W until 1934. Although the L&HR owned very few freight cars of its own, they did have a notable fleet of zinc hoppers. A local job out of Warwick would run down to Franklin every day to switch the Zinc mine as well as local industries along the Mine Hill Railroad until the mine finally closed its doors in 1954.

With the exception of the Federal Express between 1912 and 1916, passenger operations were always a minor part of the business. Service would be truncated several times over the course of the late 1920s and 1930s with the rising usage of the automobile until the only portion of the line that retained service was the original Warwick Valley line between Warwick and a connection with the Erie Railroad at Greycourt. July 8, 1939, would be the last passenger train for the L&HR as it had been petitioning New York State to discontinue the service since at least 1938.

The L&HR was headquartered and dispatched out of Warwick, New York, and had their locomotive servicing facilities there off River Street. These yards were built between 1907 and 1910 in order to handle the increase in traffic brought on by the opening of the DL&W interchange. At its peak, the yard included a 16-stall roundhouse, turntable, coaling tower, machine shop, scale, transfer shed, and an 8-track classification yard for sorting inbound trains from Maybrook. Earlier rail yards included one on Elm Street and the original terminus of the Warwick Valley Railroad at South Street. There was also a small classification yard and engine servicing terminal at Hudson Yard just north of Phillipsburg along the PRR's Bel-Del, a yard to service New Jersey Zinc at Franklin, and an interchange yard shared with the Erie at Greycourt.

== Motive Power ==
During the Warwick Valley years and up until 1880, the railroad operated as a branch of the Erie Railway's broad-gauge system, but when the Erie converted to standard gauge in 1880, the Warwick Valley bought their only two locomotives, a pair of 4-4-0's, from Cooke Locomotive and Machine Works. From the early years of the L&HR up until the turn of the century, most of their locomotives were bought from Cooke.

From 1894 until the end of steam in 1950, all of their locomotives were built by the Baldwin Locomotive Works. This included several dozen 4-6-0 and 2-8-0 camelback locomotives built between 1904 and 1908 to coincide with the increase in traffic from the Port Morris connection. L&HR power upgraded in the years during and after WWI locomotives during this time were noted for their Wootten fireboxes; designed to burn the harder anthracite coal. By the mid-1930s all of its camelbacks would be scrapped, save for 3 that were kept to handle the local turn from Warwick to Greycourt as well as the Franklin Drill which could not handle heavier locomotives on the Mine Hill Branch. As a result of traffic surges from WWII, the L&HR bought their last steam locomotives from Baldwin in 1944; a trio of 4-8-2 Mountains that, due to war-time restrictions, were virtual copies of the Boston & Maine's R1d design

Lehigh & Hudson River Railway Locomotive Roster; 1950

Number	Wheel arrangement (Whyte notation)	Build date	Builder	Notes	Disposition
52	2-8-0	1904	Baldwin	Camelback	Scrapped Dec. 1950
60,63	2-8-0	1908	Baldwin	Camelback	Scrapped Dec. 1950
70-73	2-8-2	1916	Baldwin		Scrapped Jan. 1951
80-83	2-8-2	1916	Baldwin	USRA Light 2-8-2 Design	Scrapped Jan. 1951
90-93	2-8-0	1925	Baldwin		Scrapped Jan. 1951
94-95	2-8-0	1927	Baldwin		Scrapped Jan. 1951
10-12	4-8-2	1944	Baldwin	Copied from Boston & Maine R1d	Completely overhauled and renumbered 40–42 in late 1950 but never ran again and scrapped in Feb. 1951

Despite having been a customer of Baldwin since 1894, when the end of steam came in December 1950, the replacements would be exclusively from ALCO. The L&HR bought their first 11 RS-3's early in 1950 with two additional RS-3s being purchased in 1951 bringing their total to 13 (numbered 1–13). Commonly short on power on-hand, these would be the only locomotives for nearly a dozen years until L&HR began acquiring newer Alco C-420s in 1963, some of which were acquired by trading in older RS-3s. By 1972 the L&HR would eventually sell off all of their RS-3's leaving them with 9 C-420's numbered 21–29.

http://www.northeast.railfan.net/lhr_rstr.html

== Bankruptcy ==
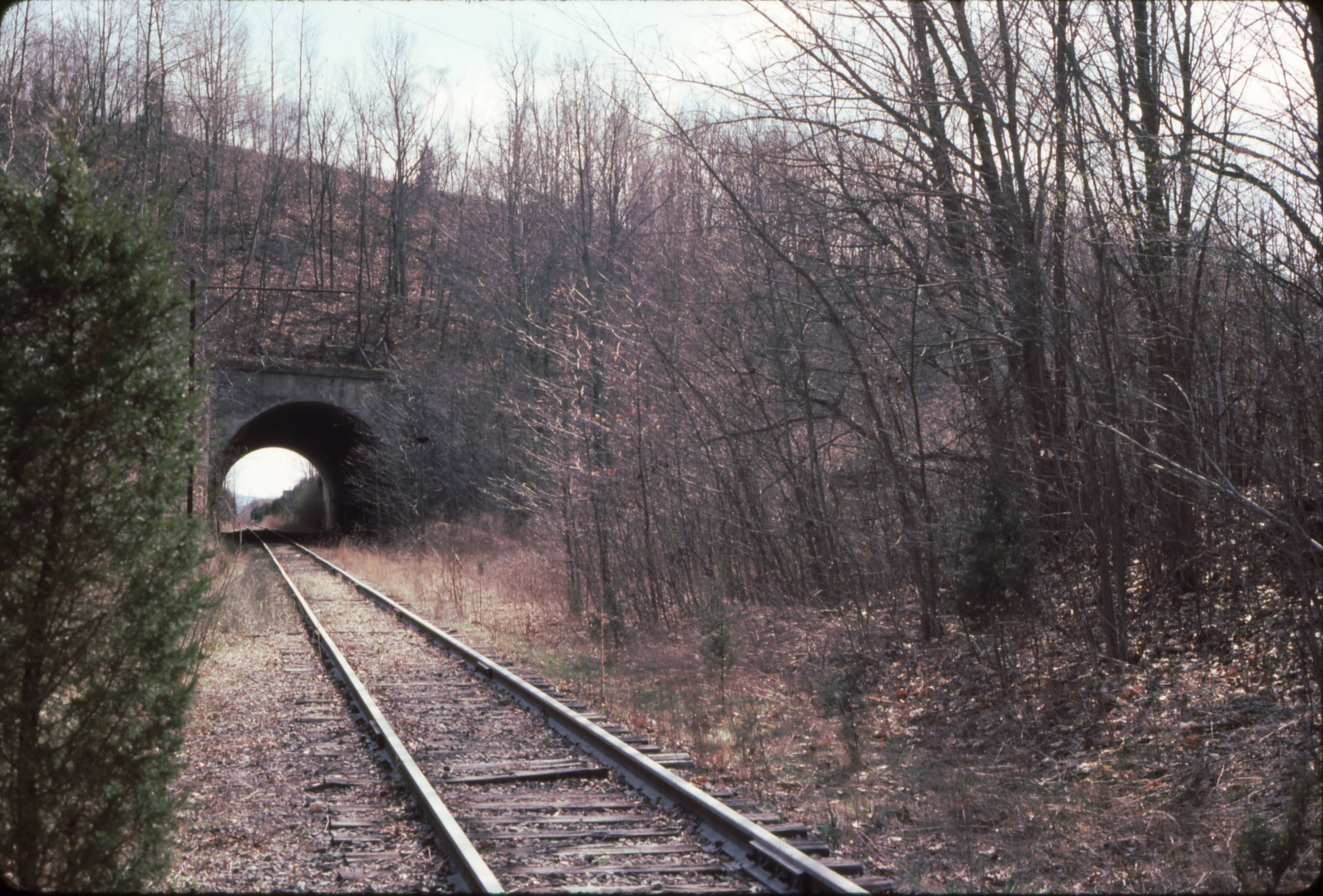
The L&HR running under the abandoned Lackawanna Cut-Off near Tranquility, New Jersey, circa 1989. By this point, the L&HR line had been abandoned, and trackage removal occurred when land ownership transferred from Conrail to land developer Jerry Turco

A profitable railroad for nearly its entire existence, The L&HR filed for Chapter 7 bankruptcy on April 19, 1972, owing partly to Penn Central's decision to operate over other routes in order to avoid the aging Poughkeepsie Bridge, along with not paying the L&HR certain due bills due to bankruptcy laws.

Post-bankruptcy, the L&HR continued to operate a nocturnal daily freight. During the mid-1970s, the L&HR became part of a proposal to run "Bunny Ski Trains" between Hoboken, New Jersey, and the Playboy Resort (Great Gorge) in Vernon, New Jersey. The proposed service, which would have run on weekends during the winter, would have retrieved passengers westbound along the Erie Lackawanna Railway's (EL) Morristown Line to Netcong, New Jersey, then run along a short section of the remaining Sussex Branch to Andover Junction in Andover, New Jersey, and then northbound along the L&HR to the Penn Central. The service would have utilized EL's new commuter consists, but was met with stiff opposition from EL management, which was anticipating a merger with other north-eastern US railroads and did not want to enter into a venture that it viewed as a potential money-loser. The Bunny Ski Train remained a viable proposal until the remaining vestige of the Sussex Branch was removed in July 1977, after it became clear that it was no longer needed as a connector to the L&HR. As such, in 1976, the L&HR was absorbed into Conrail.

== Post-company activity ==
Throughout the 1980s, in accordance with the Staggers Rail Act, Conrail abandoned their L&HR route between Warwick, New York and Belvidere, New Jersey, from a loss of freight customers, but they retained the section between Warwick and Campbell Hall. In 1982, the Delaware Otsego Corporation (DO) purchased a section of the route between Warwick and Franklin, and three years later, they purchased a section between Franklin and Limecrest near Sparta. Both sections became part of the New York, Susquehanna and Western Railway's (NYS&W) Southern Division, and the trackage was subsequently upgraded to accommodate mainline intermodal trains.

In 1988, the L&HR trackage between Limecrest and Belvidere was acquired by land developer Jerry Turco from Conrail. Turco also acquired most of the Lackawanna Cut-Off as part of the same deal. The Limecrest-Belvidere route was subsequently ripped up. Also in 1988, the NYS&W built a connecting track bypassing Maybrook by curving west onto the former Erie Graham Line (current Metro-North Railroad) at a point just north of Sarah Wells Trail in the town of Hamptonburgh. This bypass eliminated pulling through trains north to Maybrook and running around the train before continuing west through Campbell Hall. As a result of this "new" Hudson Junction, the original three miles of L&HR right-of-way from HJ to Maybrook were abandoned. HJ or Hudson Junction is not to be confused with the original Hudson Junction where the Warwick Valley Railroad to Greycourt met the 1888-built Orange County Railroad (which leapt over the Erie Mainline at Greycourt north to Maybrook).

As of 2024, approximately 42 miles (68 km) of the original 72 miles (116 km) of the original L&HR-built right-of-way between Limecrest and Campbell Hall remains intact. In New Jersey, the NYS&W owns the L&HR line from Sparta Junction to Pelton Crossing, a point just 3 miles north of the New York state line and at the throat of the former yards in Warwick, New York. At Sparta Junction, where the original NYS&W mainline used to cross the L&HR via a wye, a connection has been built to allow more direct movement between the former routes. In addition, a daily local job works out of Sparta where numerous industries are serviced by rail including a transload sugar facility, a propane facility, and others. The NYS&W also operates a single road train four times a week between Binghamton and Ridgefield Park, New Jersey which traverses the entirety of the remaining L&HR and is the only regular rail traffic between Sparta and Warwick.

From Pelton Crossing in Warwick to the "new" Hudson Junction in Hamptonburgh, the line is owned by Norfolk Southern (NS), which had acquired the line during the Conrail breakup of the late 1990s. The NS-owned portion of the line is labeled as the "Hudson Secondary" and while owned by the NS, it is dispatched by the NYS&W. Since 2010, the Middletown and New Jersey Railroad leased the Hudson Secondary from NS, and they began operating semi-daily local trains from Campbell Hall to Warwick.

While the L&HR Route from Limecrest to Belvidere was ripped up, the former PRR-owned Bel-Del, L&HR-owned Hudson Yard in Phillipsburg and the L&HR-owned South Easton and Phillipsburg Bridge over the Delaware River are still in service on the Norfolk Southern. While the line had always operated in a west-to-east orientation from Allentown to Maybrook, the NYS&W operates the line from Sparta to Warwick as east-to-west.

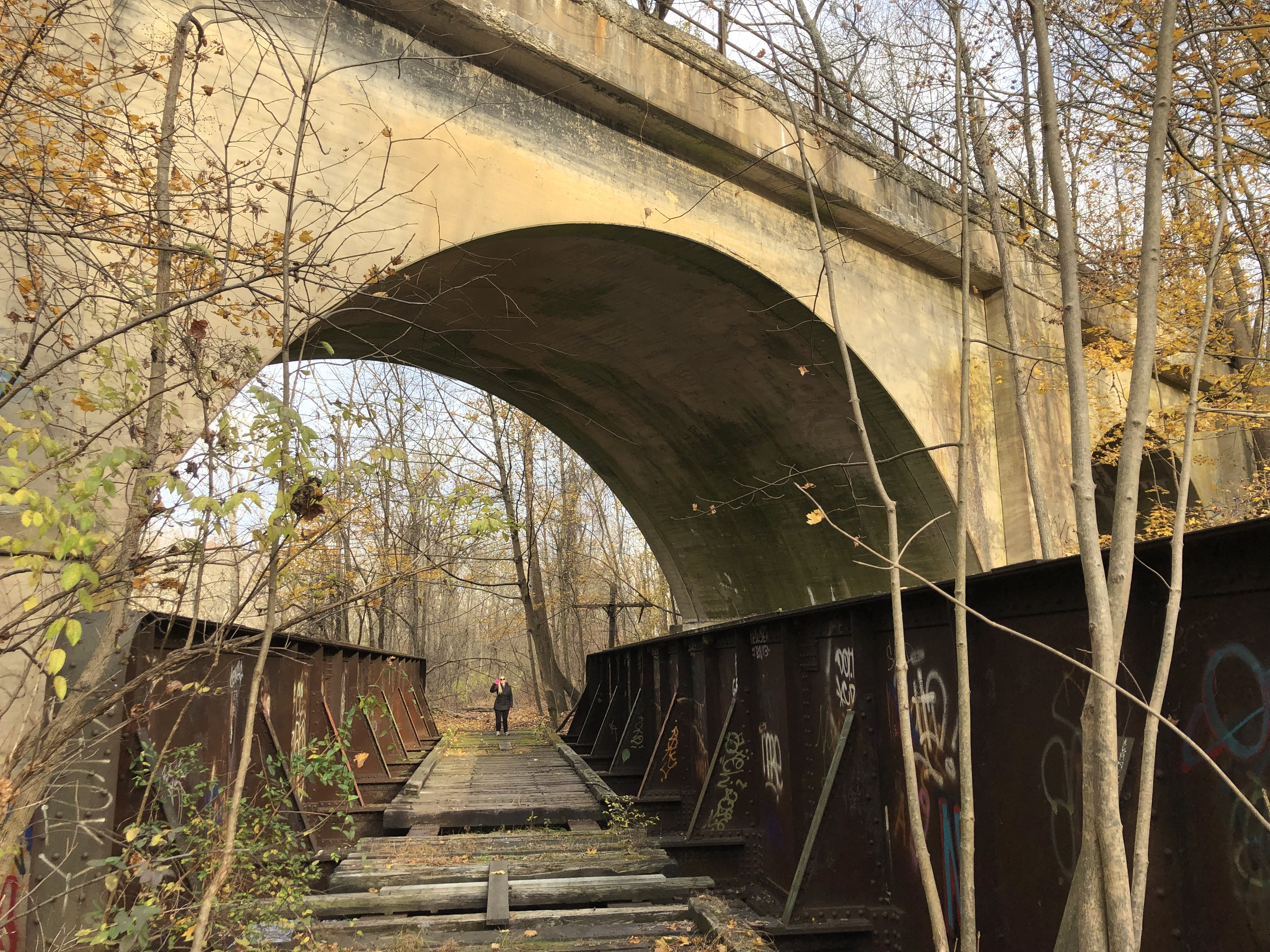
The L&HR line crossed the Pequest River under the Pequest Viaduct which carried the Lackawanna Old Road across the river as well. This section of the line is now preserved as the Pequest Wildlife Management Area Trail.

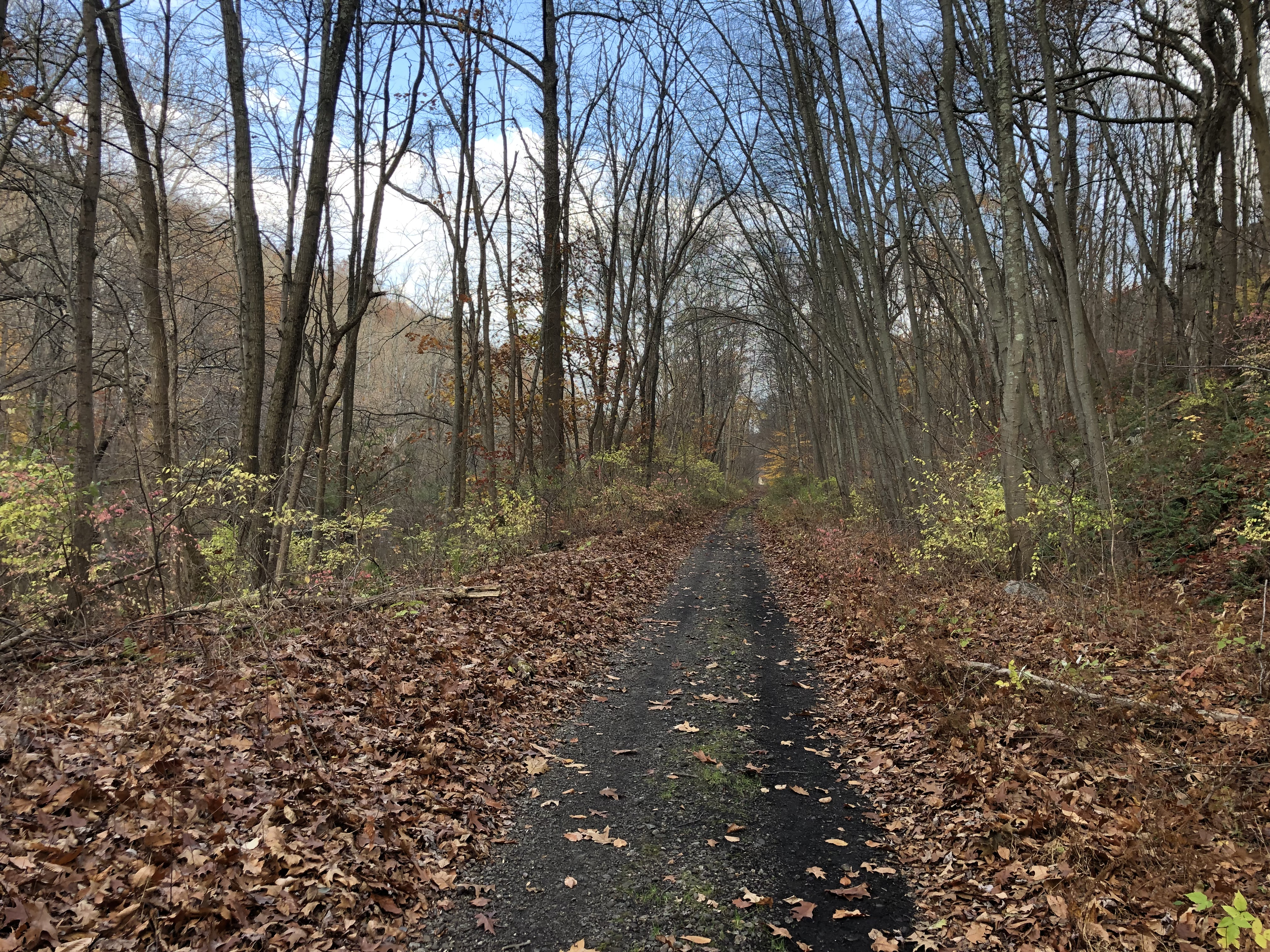
The final section of the L&HR Line running from Oxford, New Jersey, to Belvidere, New Jersey, has been preserved as a hiking trail.

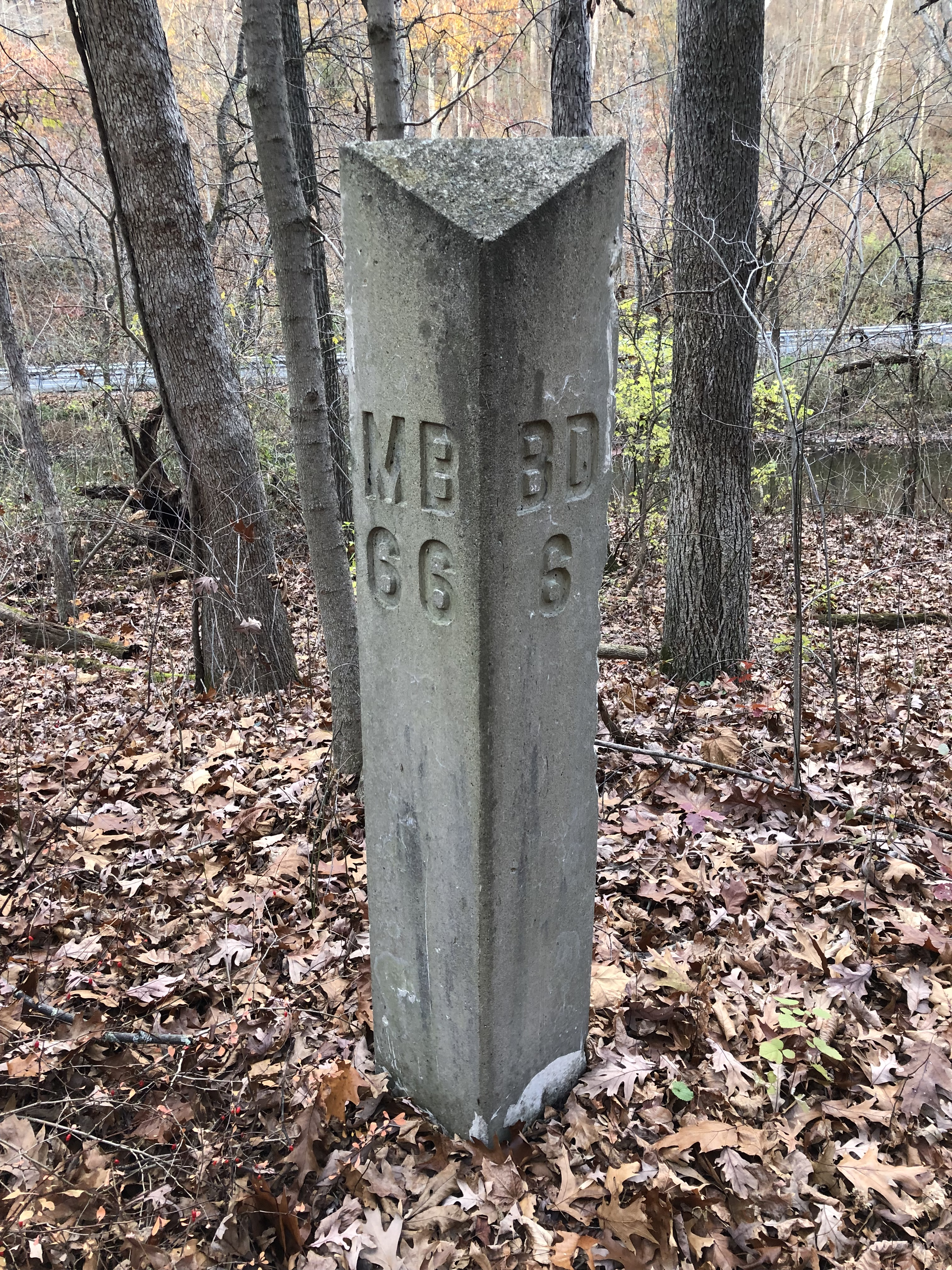
A concrete mile marker along the now abandoned final stretch of the L&HR line marking 6 miles to Belvidere, New Jersey, and 66 miles to Maybrook, New York. This can be found along the Pequest Wildlife Management Area trail between Old Furnace Road and Route 31.

The final stretch of the L&HR running west from Janes Chapel Road in Oxford, New Jersey, to Belvidere has been redeveloped as a hiking trail, the Pequest Wildlife Management Area Trail. This trail crosses the Pequest river at four locations including the when it passes under the Pequest Viaduct carrying the Lackawanna Old Road across the Pequest River. The remains of old signal towers, rail ties, power lines, and mile markers can be found in the forest along this trail.

Another section of the line running north from Kennedy Rd in Green Township, New Jersey, has been preserved as the Lehigh and Hudson Rail Trail. Whistle markers can still be found along the trail between Whitehall Rd and Rt 603. The pass under the Lackawanna Cutoff Pequest fill, despite being state-owned land, has been fenced off and is not passable. The trail terminates in Andover, New Jersey, where it crosses the Sussex Branch Trail. A new section of hiking trail has been restored beginning just to the north in Andover along the south east corner of Gardners Pond. Entering Kittatinny Valley State Park the trail continues along the east coast of Lake Aeroflex 3.5 miles until terminating at Mulford Road in Andover Township, New Jersey. It is unknown if any other sections of the abandoned line have been preserves as hiking trails.
