= Pequest Fill =

Embankment in New Jersey, US

Coordinates: 40.979°N 74.763°W

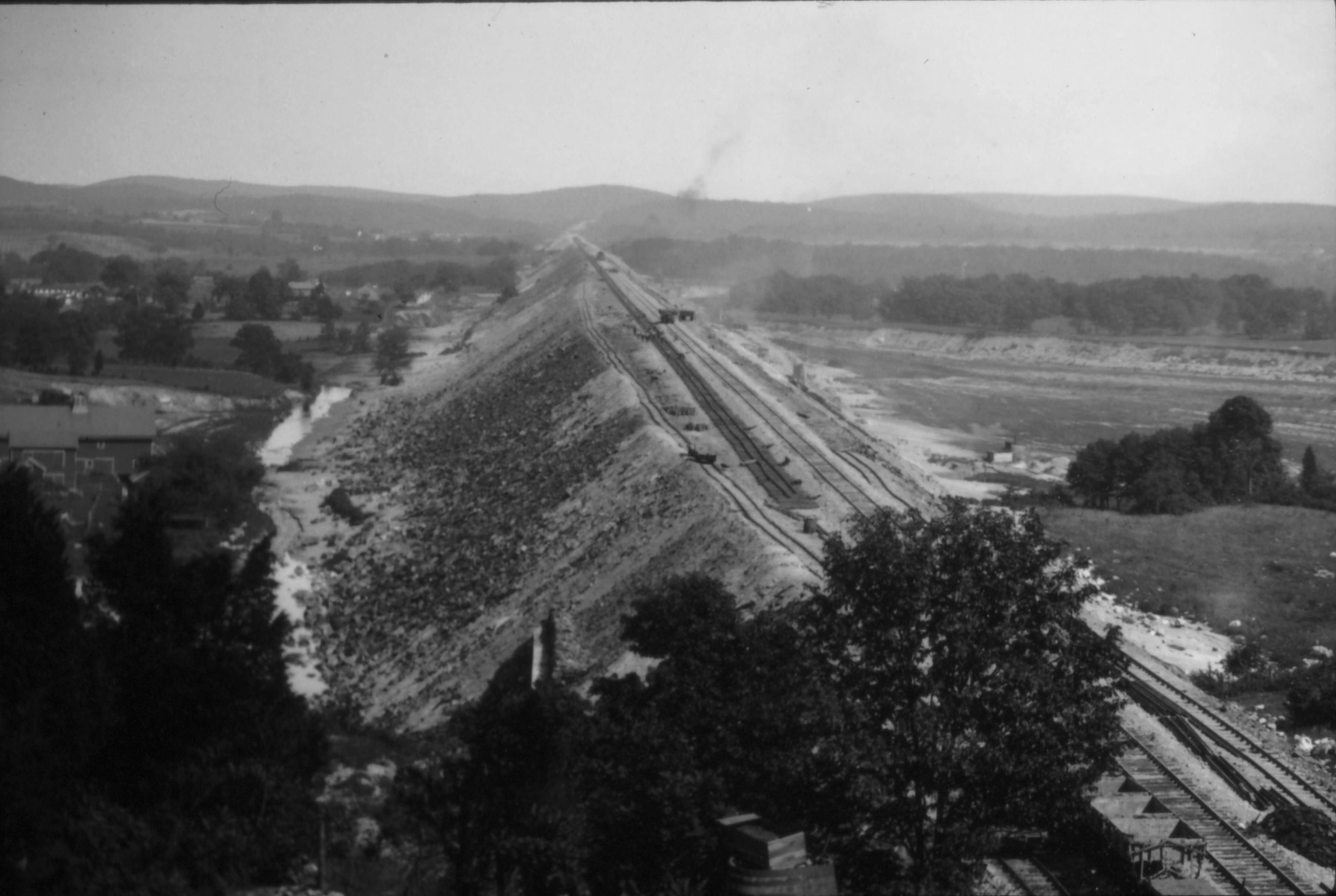
Construction of the Pequest Fill near Tranquility, New Jersey, nears completion in summer 1911. In this eastward view, the edge of the borrow pit is visible to the right. Andover Station will be built at the far end of the Fill, where the right-of-way begins to curve to the right, about three miles away.

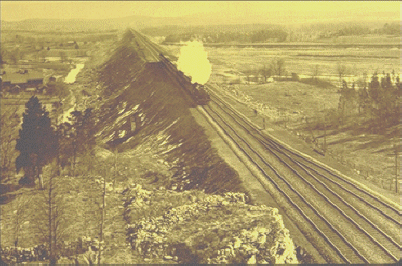
The westbound Lackawanna Limited comes off the Fill in 1912, about one mile east of the Greendell station, whose siding is visible at bottom right. The photo became the basis for a Phoebe Snow poster advertising the trimming of 11 miles from the ride to Buffalo, New York.

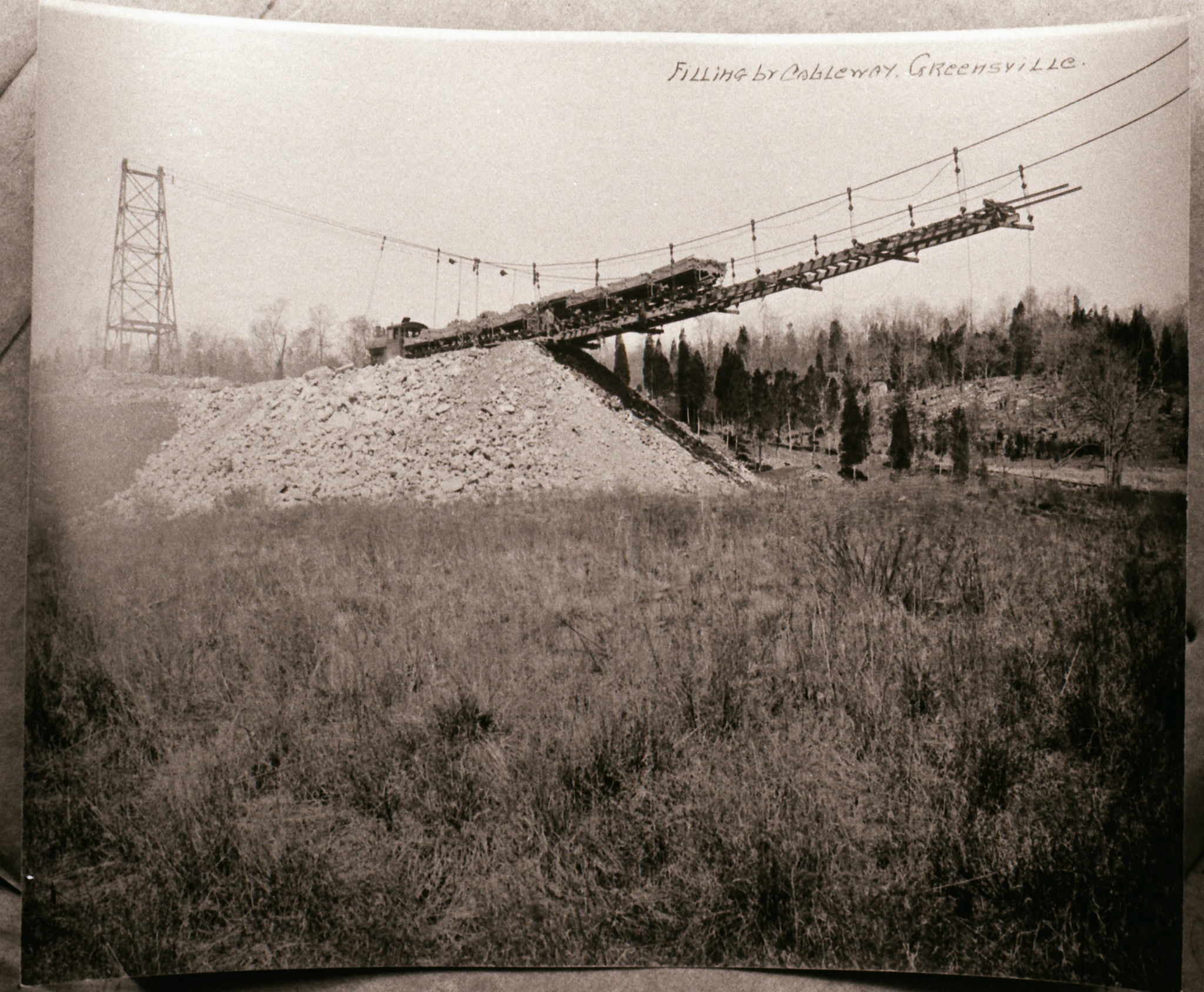
This 1910 photo shows how much of the fill was created: by dumping small skip cars of dirt from a suspended railway.

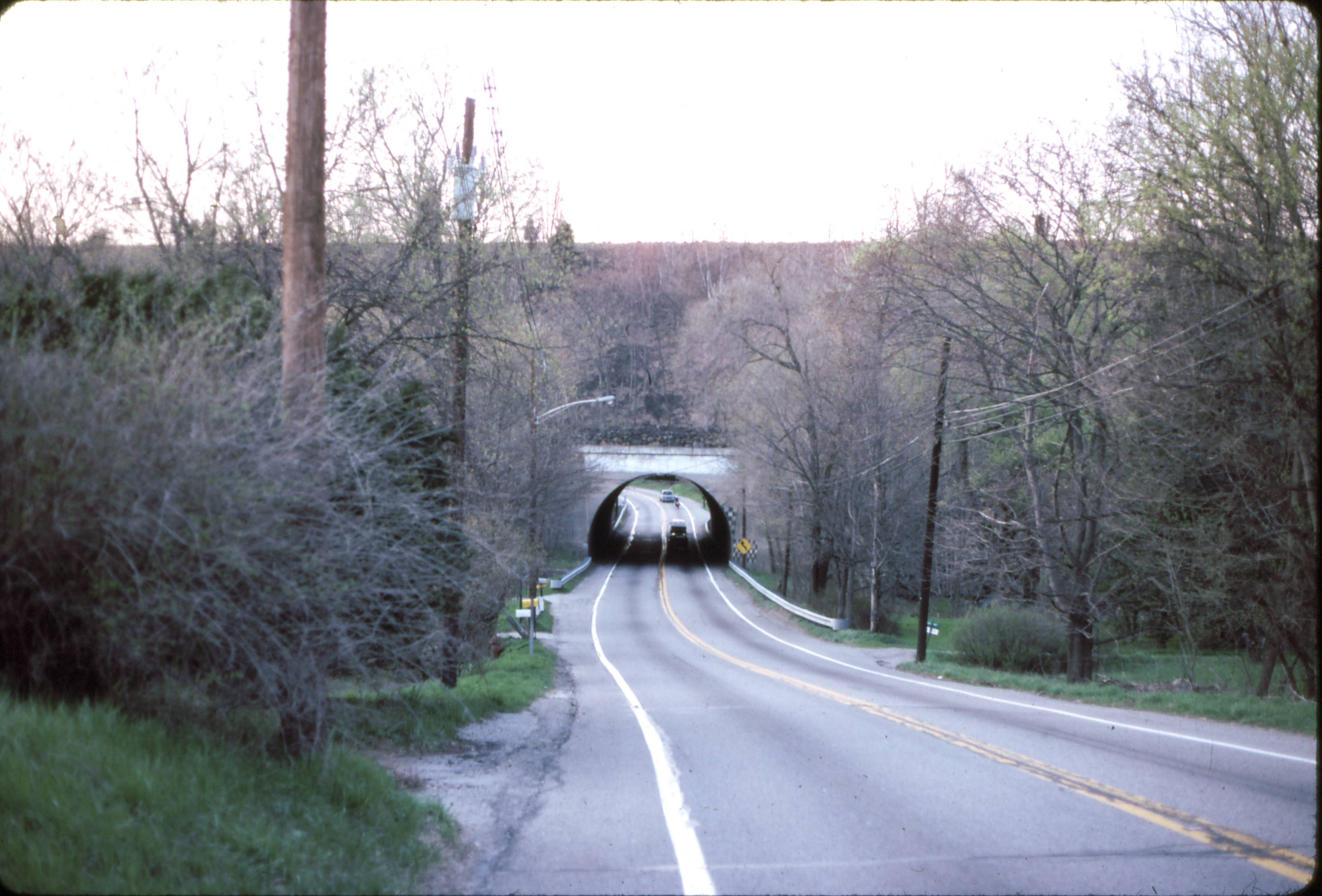
US Route 206 passes under the Fill in Andover. In this northward view, the new Andover Station will stand about a half-mile to the right.

The Pequest Fill is a three-mile (4.8 km) railroad embankment in northwestern New Jersey built by the Delaware, Lackawanna and Western Railroad as part of the Lackawanna Cut-Off. At its completion in 1911, it was touted as the largest fill and the highest embankment ever built for a railroad.

Thought to have been the brainchild of DL&W president William Truesdale, the Pequest Fill was one of several remarkable features of the Cut-Off, a 28.6-mile (46-km) project that aimed to reduce the length, grades, and curvature of the railroad's main line over the hilly terrain between Port Morris, New Jersey, and the Delaware Water Gap. During planning, Truesdale rejected 13 prospective routes that skirted the Pequest Valley in favor of a bold, costly, yet operationally superior route across it. To maintain a more or less level grade across the valley, a fill of enormous proportions would be required to connect Andover and Green Township.

Planning for the route continued through 1906; the final survey map for the line was completed on September 1, allowing the railroad to proceed with eminent domain and hire contractors. The project was divided among seven contractors. Whether by design or happenstance, the responsibility for building the Pequest Fill was divided roughly in half between David W. Flickwir to the east and Walter H. Gahagan to the west.

Construction on the Cut-Off began August 1, 1908. The foundation for the Pequest Fill would require 6.625 million cubic yards of fill material. This was far more than could be provided by classic cut-and-fill techniques, which require a relatively even balance between the amount of dirt and rock material that is removed from an area of the right-of-way to provide a cut through a hill and the needs of a nearby fill. So the railroad bought 760 acres of nearby farmland and dug it out to a depth of about 20 feet (6 m), thereby obtaining some 4.5 million cubic yards of fill.

The construction of the Fill employed "huge steam shovels similar to those used on the Panama Canal" (the number is variously given as 10 or 13). More exotically, the railroad devised a system—variously described as "movable bridges" or "a suspended aerial cableway"—that carried track from the completed portion of the embankment into the air above the uncompleted portions. A locomotive would push a string of skip cars, each carrying no more than 3 cubic yards of dirt, to dump their loads up to 100 feet to the ground below.

The Fill's footprint included the Huntsville Schoolhouse, which was purchased by the railroad. Workers ultimately buried the schoolhouse under tons of rock as the schoolchildren stood on a distant hillside and cheered.

The railroad was two tracks wide on the Fill, except for the extreme western end, which included a short section of Greendell Siding. Tunnels through the fill were built to accommodate four roadways (US Route 206 and three county roads), two railroad rights-of-way (the Lackawanna's Sussex Branch and the Lehigh & Hudson River Railway), and one river (the Pequest River). There are no overhead bridges or grade crossings. The Route 206 tunnel accommodates an unnamed tributary of the Pequest River, which flows in a 338-foot culvert under the road surface.

Construction wrapped up in autumn 1911. In the publicity blitz that accompanied the opening of the Cut-Off, newspapers across the country marveled at its engineering feats, particularly the Paulinskill Viaduct and the Pequest Fill, whose picture generally accompanied the articles. The Fill was touted as the highest railroad embankment in the world, having an average height of 105 feet as measured from the level of the Pequest River at its crossing. Its volume was also a new record, far surpassing the 4 million-plus cubic feet used by the Union Pacific railroad in its 1908 Lane's Cut-off west of Omaha, Nebraska. In the years that followed, the railroad often touted the Fill in its newspaper advertisements ("heaviest piece of railroad construction in the world"), even when the Cut-Off itself went unnamed.

The Cut-Off was used from 1911 (when the Lackawanna Cut-Off opened) until 1979 (when Conrail discontinued rail service). The Lackawanna itself operated trains for 49 years; its successor, the Erie Lackawanna Railroad, for 16 years; and Conrail for three years. After discontinuing service, Conrail sought abandonment of the line and eventually removed the tracks in 1984.

In 1985, the Cut-Off was sold to a land developer who proposed to use the Pequest Fill for the now-defunct Westway Project in New York City. That never occurred; by 2001, the Cut-Off had been acquired by the State of New Jersey.

In 2011, NJ Transit received approval to re-lay track between Port Morris Junction and Andover; as of 2023, the line is slated to open for rail service in 2026 or 2027. This Lackawanna Cut-Off Restoration Project also envisions replacing track westward across the Pequest Fill, but no funding has been secured and no completion date projected.
