= Greendell station =

GREENDELL
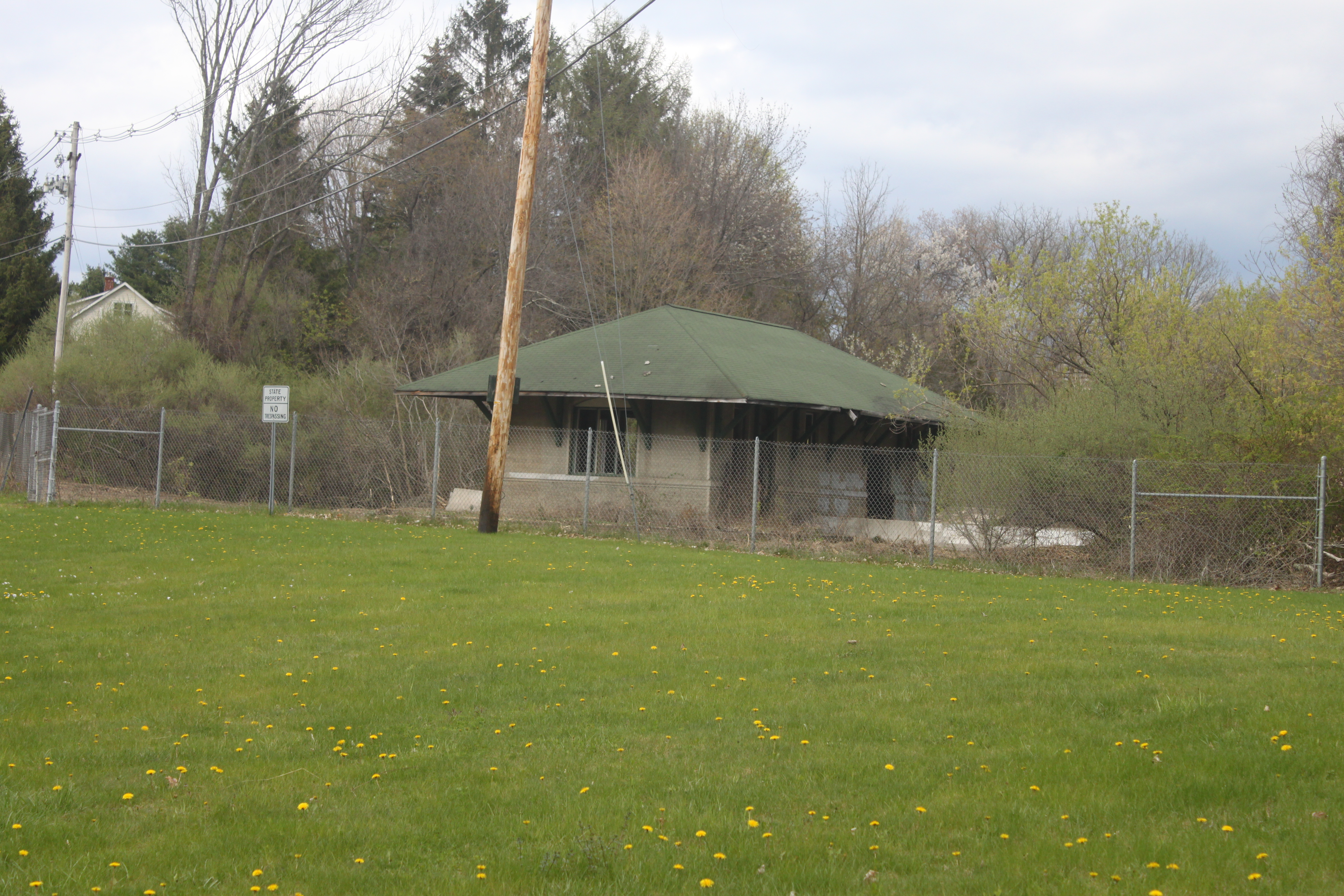
- Greendell station in May 2015.

General information
- Location: 18 Wolfs Corner Road, Green Township, New Jersey 07860
- Coordinates: 40.975305°N 74.818920°W
- Platforms: 2
- Tracks: 2

Other information
- Station code: 58 (DL&W)

History
- Opened: December 24, 1911
- Closed: June 20, 1943
- Former names: Greenville (December 24, 1911–October 1916)

Services
| Preceding station | Delaware, Lackawanna and Western Railroad | Following station |
|---|---|---|
| Johnsonburg toward Buffalo | Main Line | Lake Hopatcong toward Hoboken |
Location

Greendell is one of three original railway stations built by the Delaware, Lackawanna & Western Railroad (DL&W) along its Lackawanna Cut-Off line in northwestern New Jersey. The station, which still stands in Green Township at milepost 57.61 on the Cut-Off, began operations on December 23, 1911, one day before the line itself.

== History ==
Contractor Walter H. Gahagan built the station building and its signal tower, called "GD tower" after its telegraph call letters. The facility controlled a somewhat elaborate 4-mile (6.4 km) siding with multiple switching points, built to accommodate freight traffic on the railroad's double-track main line. Located about midway between Slateford Junction and Port Morris Junction and a few miles east of the ruling grade on the Cut-Off, the siding allowed slow freights to pull off the main line and wait for faster trains to pass. Its eastern end began on the Pequest Fill.

Initially called Greensville, the station was renamed Greendell in October 1916. As time went on, its modest passenger patronage relegated the station to a flag stop: most trains skipped it and stopped at Blairstown station on the Cut-Off instead. Finally, the station closed in 1938.

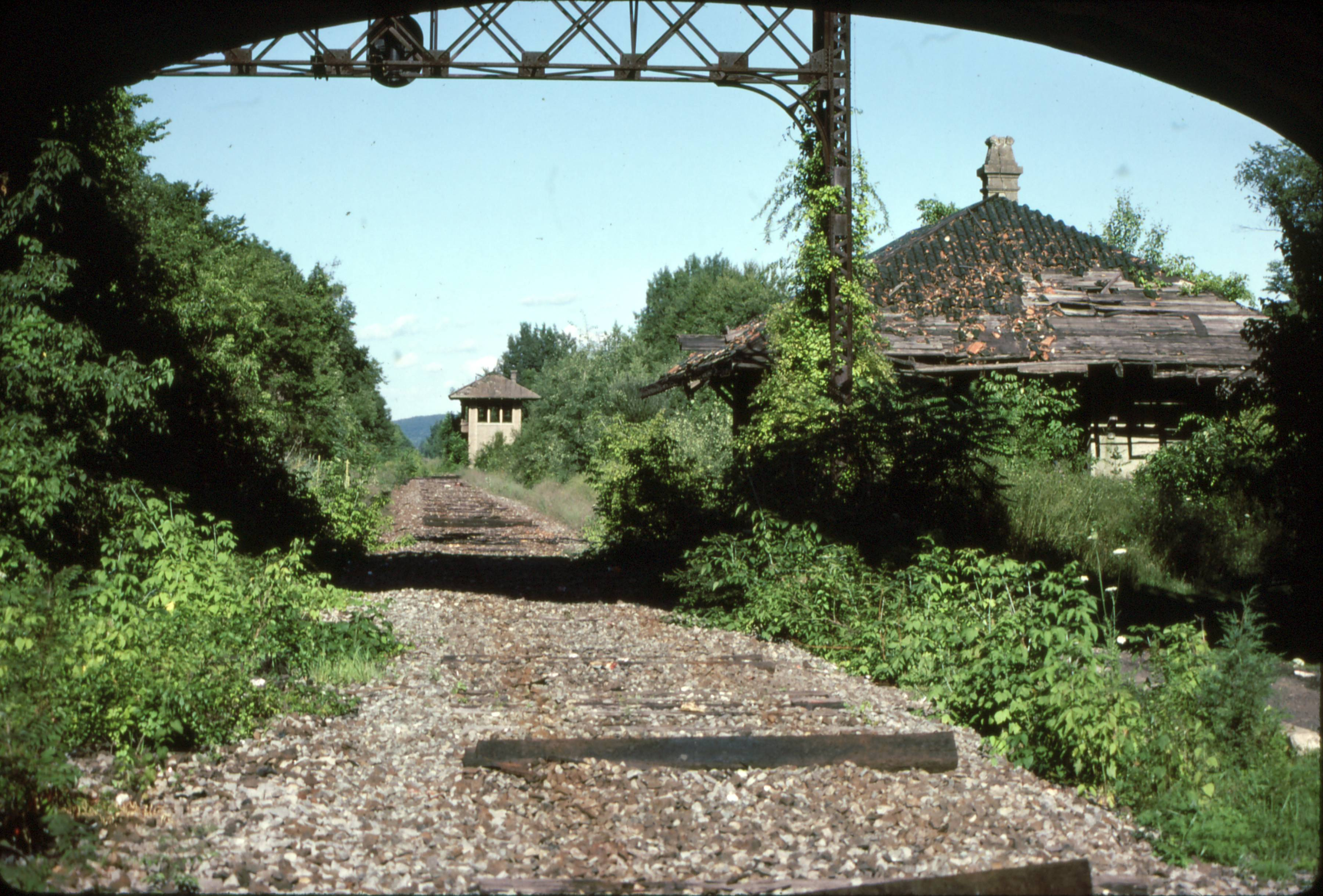
Greendell station (foreground) and tower (background) in 1988, four years after the tracks were removed on the line. The shot looks eastbound towards the Pequest Fill.

The Lackawanna vied for Green Township's freight business (mostly related to farming and agriculture), with the Lehigh and Hudson River Railway, which had arrived some three decades earlier. As business declined during the 1930s, the tower was closed—either on January 8, 1932, or March 10, 1935; company records conflict—and its functions transferred to Port Morris Tower. The Greendell station, however, continued to serve freight customers.

In anticipation of its 1960 merger with the Erie Railroad, the Lackawanna single-tracked the Cut-Off in 1958, but retained the siding to keep some operational flexibility. In the mid-1960s, as fewer and fewer trains were being run over the Cut-Off by the Erie Lackawanna, Greendell Siding was cut to about 1.5 miles (2.4 km): about the length of the longest freight trains being run at the time. The railroad ended passenger service on the Cut-Off on January 6, 1970, but freight traffic revived.

Greendell Siding survived until Conrail finally ended rail service on the Cut-Off in late 1978. The final freight shipment to a customer on the Cut-Off was delivered by Conrail to Greendell. The tracks were removed from the Cut-Off by Conrail in 1984.

In October 1999, the Sussex County Engineer, Eric Grove, announced that the Green Road (CR 611) bridge next to Greendell station would need to be demolished. The 103-foot (31 m) long humpback bridge was in poor state and dangerous to modern drivers. The bridge was 18 feet (5.5 m) wide while the main road was 25 feet (7.6 m) wide. Demolition was preferred over restoration due to cost, and due to the quality of Lackawanna construction, demolition was not a cheap option. As part of the demolition, a nearby 28-foot (8.5 m) signal bridge would be dismantled and sent to Phillipsburg.

As of 2023, the station building has been secured. The Lackawanna Cut-Off Historical Committee, a New Jersey–based historical group, is raising funds to restore the station building and surrounding site. As of 2024, the station is fenced off by the state government with "No Trespassing" signs and video surveillance warnings. The station can no longer be used to enter the Lackawanna Cutoff to the east.

Service along the Cut-Off is being partially restored, with NJ Transit service from Andover to New York City projected to start by late 2026 or early 2027. Amtrak has also proposed to extend service along the Cut-Off to Scranton, Pennsylvania.

== See also ==
- List of NJ Transit railroad stations
