= Lackawanna Cut-Off =

U.S. railway line between Port Morris, New Jersey, and Slateford, Pennsylvania

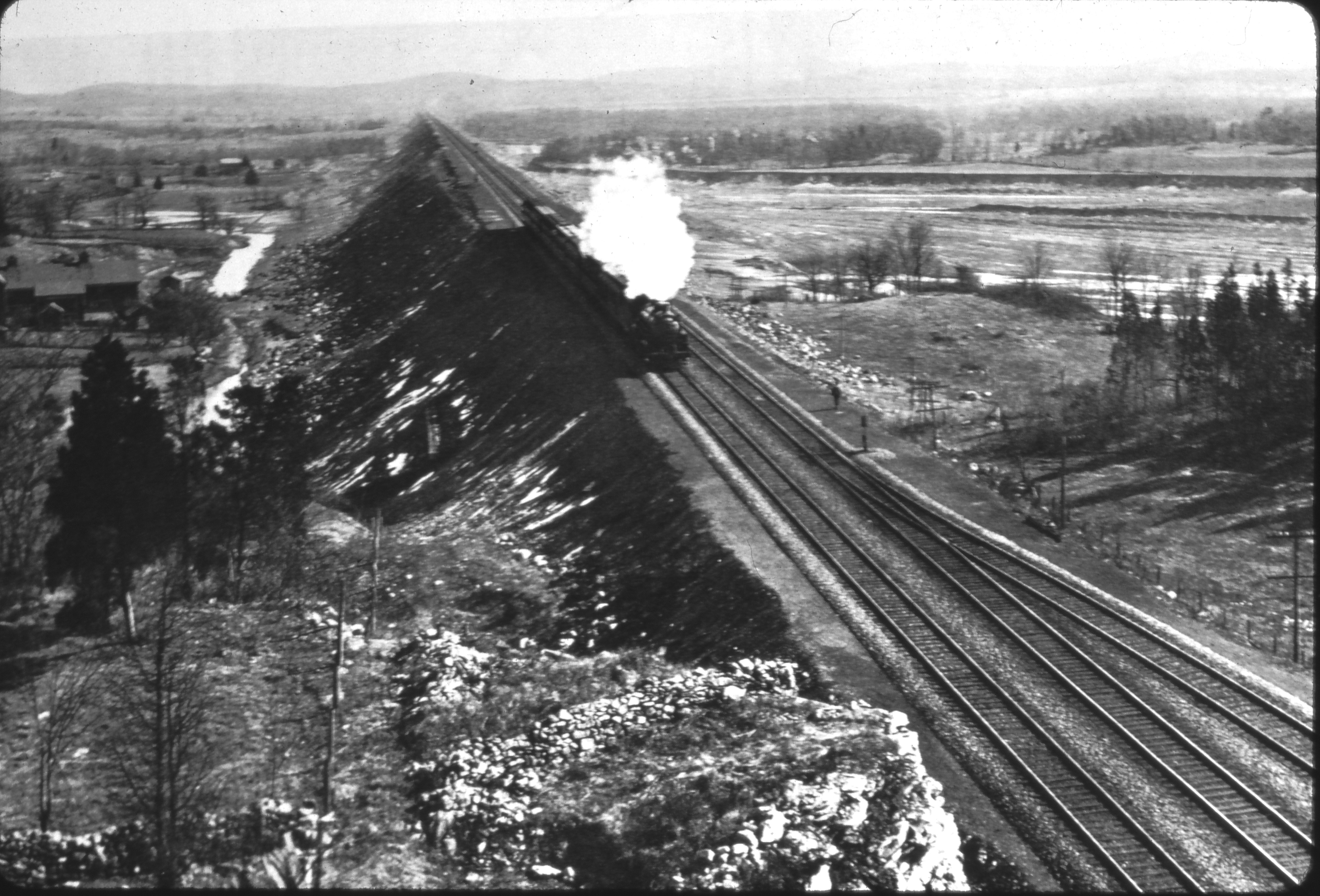
- Westbound Lackawanna Limited near Pequest Fill, c. 1912; the photo that later inspired a Phoebe Snow poster

Overview
- Status: Restoration in progress (Port Morris Junction–Andover); Abandoned (Andover–Slateford Junction)
- Owner: State of New Jersey, Pennsylvania Department of Transportation, Pennsylvania Northeast Regional Railroad Authority
- Locale: New Jersey; Pennsylvania
- Termini: Port Morris Junction in Port Morris, New Jersey; Slateford Junction in Slateford, Pennsylvania

Service
- Operator(s): Delaware, Lackawanna & Western Railroad (1911–60); Erie Lackawanna Railway (1960–76); Conrail (1976–79); NJ Transit (2011–present)

History
- Opened: 1911–1979, 2011–present (NJ Transit currently uses short section from Port Morris Jct. for temporary storage)
- Closed: 1979–2011 (tracks removed in 1984)

Technical
- Line length: 28.45 mi (45.8 km)
- Number of tracks: 2 (1911–58); 1 (1958–84); 0 (1984–2011); 1 under construction (2011–) passing sidings: 7 (1911); 3 (1979); 0 (1984)
- Character: Surface
- Track gauge: 1,435 mm (4 ft 8 1/2 in)
- Operating speed: 80 mph (130 km/h)

The Lackawanna Cut-Off (also known as the New Jersey Cut-Off, the Hopatcong-Slateford Cut-Off and the Blairstown Cut-Off) was a rail line built by the Delaware, Lackawanna and Western Railroad (DL&W). Constructed from 1908 to 1911, the line was part of a 396-mile (637 km) main line between Hoboken, New Jersey, and Buffalo, New York. It ran west for 28.45 miles (45.79 km) from Port Morris Junction in Port Morris, New Jersey, near the south end of Lake Hopatcong about 45 miles (72 km) west-northwest of New York City, to Slateford Junction in Slateford, Pennsylvania near the Delaware Water Gap.

When it opened on December 24, 1911, the Cut-Off was considered a super-railroad, a state-of-the-art rail line, having been built using large cuts and fills and two large concrete viaducts, allowing what was considered high-speed travel at that time. It was 11 miles (18 km) shorter than the Lackawanna Old Road, the rail line it superseded; it had a much gentler ruling gradient (0.55% vs. 1.1%); and it had 42 fewer curves, with all but one of those remaining permitting passenger train speeds of 70 mph (110 km/h) or more. It also had no railroad crossings at the time of its construction. All but one of the line's 73 structures were built of reinforced concrete, a pioneering use of the material. The construction of the roadbed required the movement of millions of tons of fill material using techniques similar to those used on the Panama Canal.

Operated through a subsidiary, Lackawanna Railroad of New Jersey, the Cut-Off remained in continual operation for 68 years, through the DL&W's 1960 merger with the Erie Railroad to form the Erie Lackawanna Railroad and the EL's conveyance into Conrail in 1976. Conrail ceased operation of the Cut-Off in January 1979, removed the track in 1984, and sold the right-of-way to private developers.

In 2001, the state of New Jersey acquired the right-of-way within its borders; the short section in Pennsylvania was eventually conveyed to the Pennsylvania Northeast Regional Railroad Authority. A project to restore service on the east end of the Cut-Off to Andover, New Jersey, is to be complete in 2026. Amtrak is studying the possible restoration of passenger service over the route to Scranton, Pennsylvania.

== History ==
=== Before the Cut-Off (1851–1905) ===
The line's origin involves two men who most likely never met: John I. Blair and William Truesdale. Blair built the DL&W's Warren Railroad, chartered in 1851 and completed in 1862, to provide a connection between the mainlines of the DL&W in Pennsylvania and the Central Railroad of New Jersey (CNJ) in New Jersey. But when the Lackawanna-CNJ merger fell through and the Lackawanna merged with the Morris & Essex Railroad in New Jersey instead, the Warren Railroad became part of a circuitous patchwork of rail lines connecting two unanticipated merger partners.

The 39-mile (63 km) route (later known as the "Old Road" after the New Jersey Cut-Off opened) had numerous curves that restricted trains to 50 mph (80 km/h). The bigger operational problem, however, was caused by the two tunnels on the line: Manunka Chunk Tunnel, a 975-foot (297 m) twin-bore tunnel whose eastern approach occasionally flooded with heavy rains; and the 2,969-foot (905 m) single-bore Oxford Tunnel, which was double-tracked in 1869 and reduced to gauntlet track in 1901. As more and more traffic moved over the line, Oxford Tunnel became the Lackawanna Railroad's worst bottleneck.

Truesdale became DL&W president on March 2, 1899 with a mandate to upgrade the entire 900-mile (1,450 km) railroad. Early on, the railroad focused on increasing freight capacity by using larger locomotives and cars, as well as strengthening bridges to handle these larger loads. Although Truesdale recognized early on that the Old Road needed to be replaced, it really wasn't until after 1905 that the railroad was in a position to take up the project in earnest. This led Truesdale to authorize teams of surveyors to map out potential replacement routes westward from Port Morris, New Jersey, to the Delaware River for what would be the railroad's largest project up until that time.

=== Planning and construction (1905–1911) ===
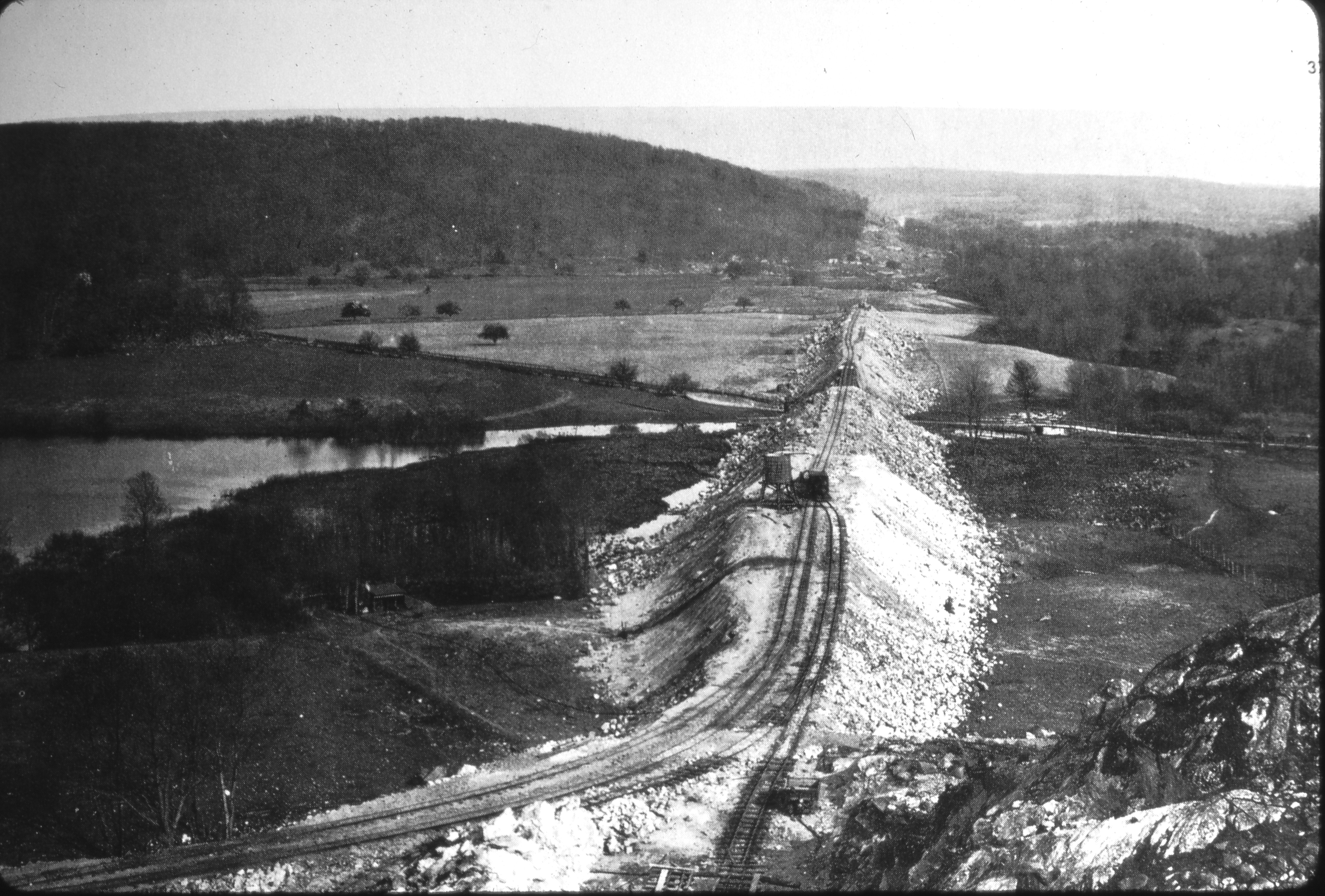
A May 1909 view of the Wharton Fill looking east from atop Roseville Tunnel, ten months into construction

During 1905–06, 14 routes were surveyed (labeled with letters of the alphabet), including several that would have required long tunnels. On September 1, 1906, a route without tunnels was chosen. This New Road (Route "M") would run from the crest of the watershed at Lake Hopatcong at Port Morris Junction to 2 mi (3.2 km) south of the Delaware Water Gap on the Pennsylvania side of the Delaware River at Slateford Junction.

At 28.45 miles (45.9 km), the line would be about 11 mi (18 km) shorter than the 39.6-mile (63.7 km) Old Road. The new route would have only 15 curves – 42 fewer curves than the Old Road, the equivalent of more than four complete circles of curvature – which increased speeds and decreased running time – more so for freight, but for passenger trains as well. The ruling grade was cut in half from 1.1% to 0.55%. The new line would also be built without railroad crossings to avoid collisions with automobiles and horse-drawn vehicles.

Uncertain national economic conditions in 1907 delayed the official start of construction until August 1, 1908. The project was divided into seven sections, one for each contracting company. Sections 3–6 were 5 miles (8 km) each; Sections 1–2 and 7 were of varying lengths. (Theoretically, to divide the 28.45-mile (46 km) line evenly, the seven sections should have been just over four miles each, but that would have placed the Pequest Fill entirely within Section 3 and the two viaducts within Section 7.) The amount of work per mile varied; the largest share apparently went to David W. Flickwir, whose Section 3 included Roseville Tunnel and the eastern half of the Pequest Fill. DL&W chief engineer George G. Ray oversaw the project, although given the size and remote location of the project, Assistant Chief Engineer F.L. Wheaton was assigned the task of overseeing the construction in person.

To accommodate the labor gangs, deserted farmhouses were converted to barracks, with tent camps providing additional shelter. These workers, many of whom came from Italy and other foreign countries or other parts of the U.S., were recruited and would move on to other projects after their work on the Cut-Off was completed. These workers were viewed with suspicion by the local populace in Warren and Sussex counties, with the town of Blairstown going as far as hiring a watchman at $40 per month for the duration of the project. Supervisory personnel and skilled laborers stayed in local hotels, boarding houses, or local farmhouses, usually at exorbitant rates ($1–2 per day) during the years of construction.

With several thousand men working on the project for over three years, the area all along the Cut-Off, and as far west as Portland, Pennsylvania, benefitted financially.

As many as 30 workers may have lost their lives building the Cut-Off. Most of their names remain unknown because they were registered with their contractor by number only. In 1910, for example, five workers were killed in a single blasting mishap near Port Morris, one of several deadly accidents that involved dynamite. Other workers died in machinery or cable car accidents, or landslides. At least one worker is known to have died of typhoid fever.

==== Sections ====
Features	Length (ft)	Max. height or depth (ft)	Avg. height or depth (ft)	Concrete used (yds^{3})	Fill material used or removed (yds^{3})	Notes
Section 1: Timothy Burke, miles 45.7–48.2 (Port Morris Jct. – cut west of CR 605 bridge)
Port Morris Junction Tower	–	–	–	–	–	Reinforced concrete, closed in 1979.
McMickle Cut	5,500	54	29	–	600,000	Located west of Musconetcong River
Section 2: Waltz & Reece Construction Co., miles 48.2–50.2 (Cut west of CR 605 bridge – Lake Lackawanna)
Waltz & Reece Cut	3,600	114	37	–	822,400	Crossed by Sussex County Route 605 overhead bridge
Bradbury Fill	4,000	78	24	–	457,000	Located in front of large cliff
Lubber Run Fill	2,100	98	64	–	720,000	At Lake Lackawanna
Section 3: David W. Flickwir, miles 50.2–55.8 (Lake Lackawanna – center of Pequest Fill)
Wharton Fill	about 2,600	–	–	–		Just east of Roseville Tunnel
Roseville Tunnel	1,040	–	–	–	35,000	Unstable rock made tunneling necessary instead of cut; track moved to center of bore in 1974.
Colby Cut	2,800	110	45	–	462,342	Rockslide detectors installed in 1950.
Pequest Fill (eastern half)	16,500	110	75	–	6,625,648	Numbers are totals; Pequest Fill was divided equally between two contractors
Section 4: Walter H. Gahagan, miles 55.8–60.8 (Center of Pequest Fill – Johnsonburg station)
Pequest Fill (western half)	–	–	–	–	–	World's largest railroad fill when built.
Greendell station / tower	–	–	–	–	–	Reinforced concrete, closed ca. 1942–43; tower closed in 1938; a flag stop for many years
Section 5: Hyde, McFarlan & Burke, miles 60.8–65.8 (Johnsonburg station – 1 mile west of Blairstown station)
Johnsonburg station / creamery	–	–	–	–	–	Reinforced concrete, located on Ramsey Fill; closed in 1942–43; station razed in 2007.
Ramsey Fill	2,800	80	21	-	805,481	Location of Johnsonburg station
Armstrong Cut	4,700	104	52	–	852,000	Largest cut on line; north side of cut collapsed and trimmed back in 1941
Blairstown station / freight house	–	–	–	–	–	Reinforced concrete, located within Jones Cut; closed in Jan 1970
Jones Cut	–	–	–	–	578,000	Location of Blairstown station
Vail Fill	1,700	102	33	–	293,500	Located on 1 degree curve
Section 6: Reiter, Curtis & Hill, miles 65.8–70.8 (1 mile west of Blairstown station – west end of Paulinskill Viaduct)
Paulins Kill Viaduct	1,100	115	–	43,212	–	Reinforced concrete bridge over Paulinskill and New York, Susquehanna & Western Railroad; world's largest reinforced concrete structure when built.
Section 7: Smith, McCormick Co., miles 70.8–74.3 (west end of Paulinskill Viaduct – Slateford Jct.)
Delaware River Viaduct	1,452	65	–	–	–	Reinforced concrete; originally planned as a curved structure. Smith, McCormick Co. built the viaduct and sub-contracted the grading of Section 7 to James A. Hart Co. of New York.
Slateford Junction Tower	–	–	–	–	–	Reinforced concrete, closed in Jan 1951

Paulinskill Viaduct near Hainesburg is 115 ft (35 m) tall and was the world's largest reinforced concrete structure when built.

The Cut-Off's reinforced concrete structures (73 in all), which consumed 266,885 cubic yards (204,048 m^{3}) of concrete and 735 tons of steel, include underpasses, culverts, and the two large viaducts on the western end of the line.

Some five million pounds (2,300 t) of dynamite were used to blast the cuts on the line. A total of 14,621,100 cubic yards (11,178,600 m^{3}) of fill material was required for the project, more than could be obtained from the project's cuts. This forced the DL&W to purchase 760 acres (310 ha) of farmland for borrow pits. Depending on the fill size, material was dumped from trains that backed out onto track on wooden trestles or suspended on cables between steel towers. During construction, several foreign governments sent representatives on inspection tours to study these new techniques.

The Pequest Fill extended west of Andover to Huntsville, New Jersey. It was at its maximum height 110 feet (34 m) tall and was 3.12 miles (5.0 km) long, requiring 6,625,648 cubic yards (5,065,671 m^{3}) of fill. Armstrong Cut was 100 feet (30 m) deep and 1 mile (1.6 km) long, mostly through solid rock. The line's deepest cut was Colby Cut (immediately west of what would become Roseville Tunnel) at 130 feet (40 m) deep. The tunnel was not in the original plans for the Cut-Off, and in fact much of the cut above the tunnel had already been blasted when in October 1909 unstable anticline rock was encountered, leading to a decision to abandon the cut and to blast what would become a 1,040-foot (320 m) tunnel instead. Contractor David W. Flickwir, whose section included Roseville Tunnel and the eastern half of the Pequest Fill, worked around the clock during the summer of 1911 when construction fell behind schedule.

Stations were built in Greendell, Johnsonburg and Blairstown; the Greendell area was already being served by the nearby Lehigh & Hudson River Railroad in Tranquility. Interlocking towers were built at Port Morris Junction and Greendell, New Jersey, and Slateford Junction in Pennsylvania.

The final cost of the project was $11,065,512 in 1911. Adjusted for inflation, this sum would be $382,352,959 today. But to build such a project today would cost far more; one 1987 estimate put the modern pricetag at $1 billion or more.

=== Heyday (1911–1958) ===
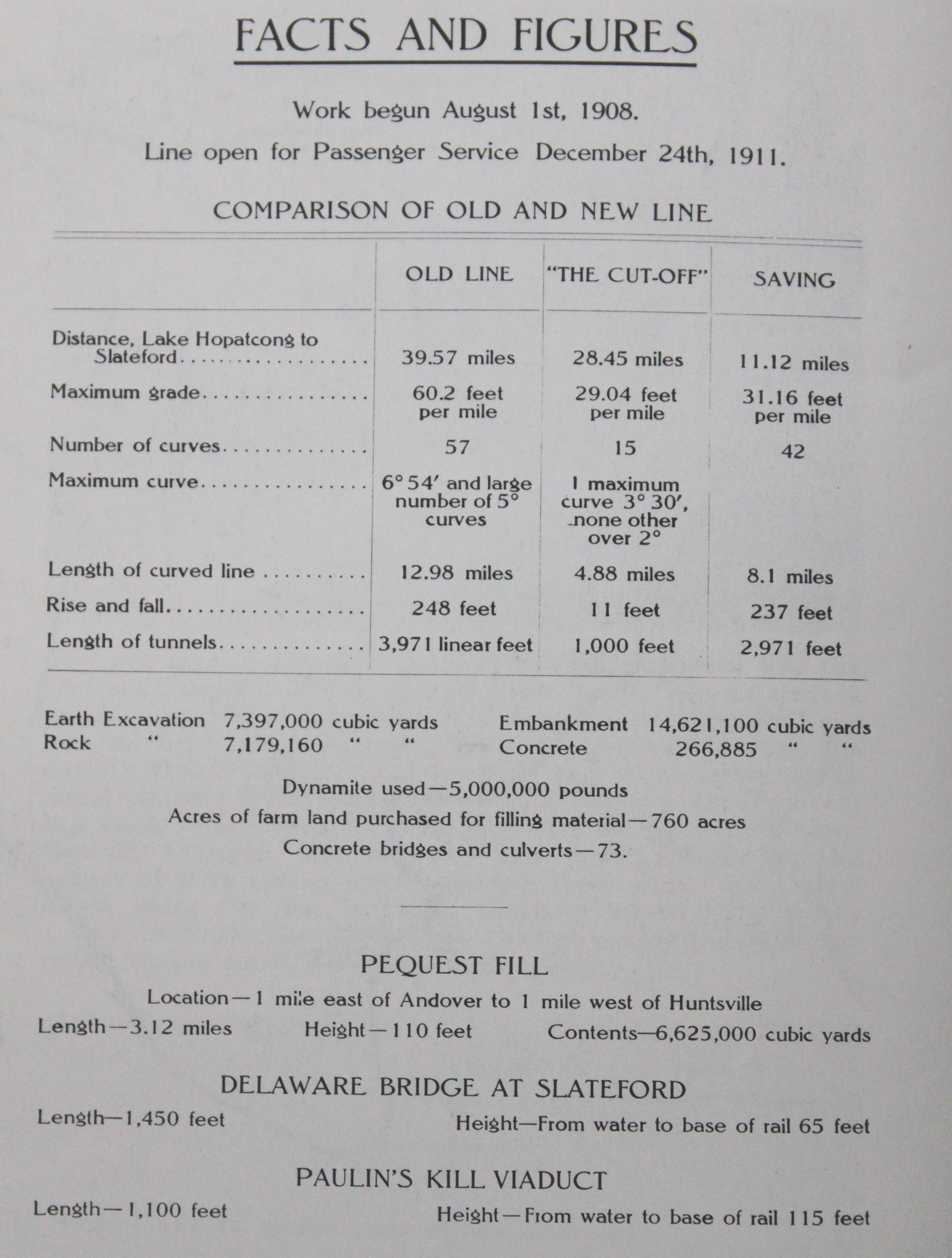
A brochure about the construction of the Cut-Off, given to news reporters during the December 15, 1911 inspection trip

The first revenue train to operate on the Cut-Off under the new timetable that went into effect at 12:01 a.m. on December 24, 1911, was No. 15, a westbound passenger train that passed through Port Morris Junction at about 3:36 a.m. Most long-distance trains that traversed the Old Road shifted to the Cut-Off, effectively downgrading the older line to secondary status. The Old Road between the borough of Washington and the town of Delaware (part of the original Warren Railroad), would be abandoned in 1968 and the tracks between the two points removed in 1970.

The Cut-Off was built to permit unrestricted speeds for passenger trains of 70 mph (110 km/h) (heavier rail that was installed later allowed speeds to increase to 80 mph (130 km/h)). Sidings were built at Slateford, Hainesburg, Johnsonburg, Greendell, Roseville, and Port Morris; about 25% of the route contained additional sidings. With upwards of 50 trains a day, towermen often ordered freight trains to take a siding or even be rerouted over the Old Road. As traffic decreased, Hainesburg, Johnsonburg and Roseville sidings were altered or removed. The remaining sidings remained in use until 1979.

Roseville Tunnel posed occasional problems, especially during the winter with snow and ice buildup. Rockslides were a constant threat west of the tunnel, in Colby Cut. In recognition of this, a detector fence was installed west of Roseville Tunnel in 1950 to change trackside signals to red if rocks fell. The most serious rockslide to ever occur on the line, however, would take place within Armstrong Cut (just west of Johnsonburg) in 1941, closing the line for nearly a month, and causing trains to be rerouted via the Old Road. The north side of Armstrong Cut was trimmed to prevent further rockslides.

==== Passenger ====
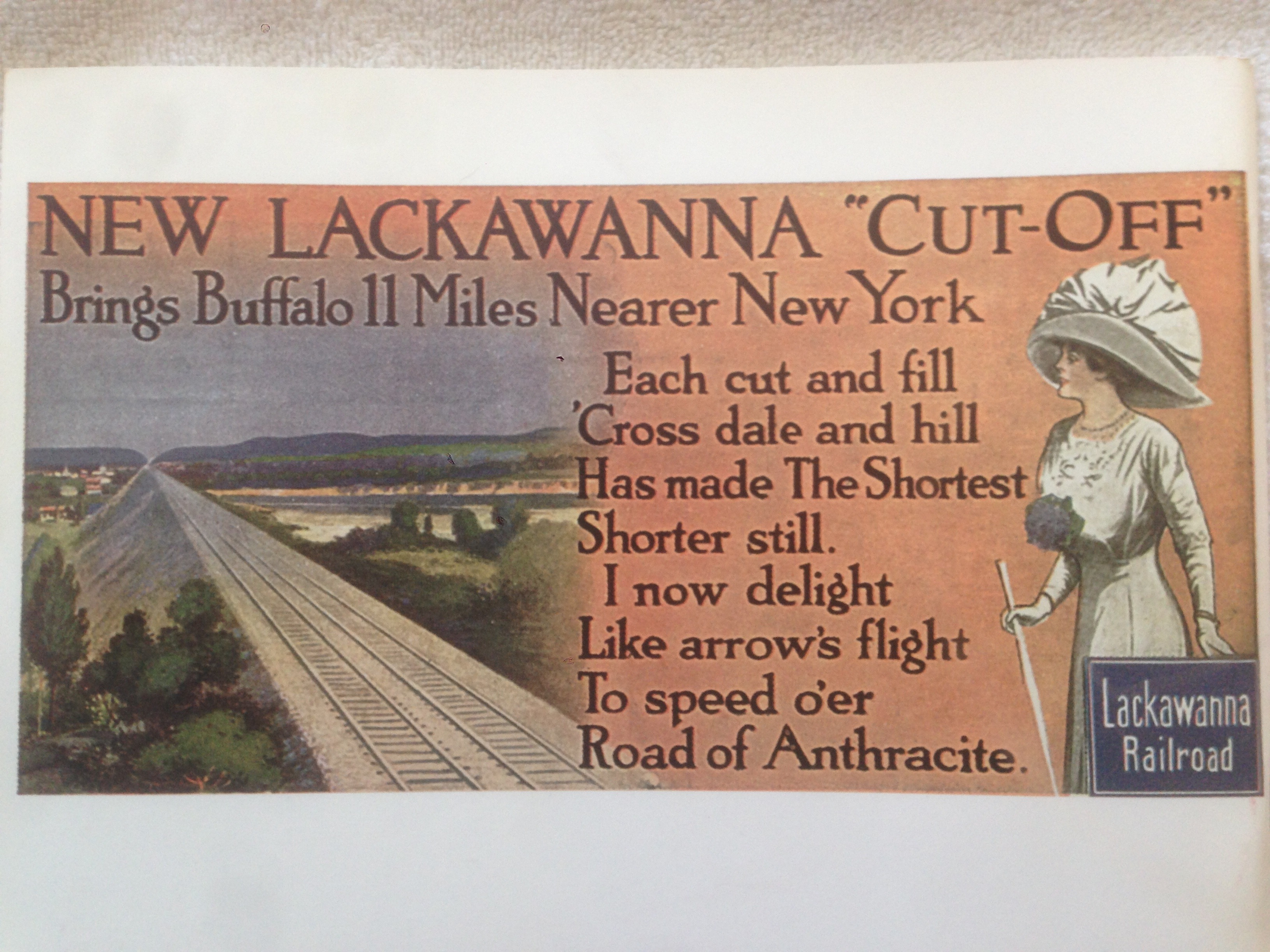
A Phoebe Snow poster showing the Pequest Fill on the new New Jersey Cut-Off, 11 miles (18 km) shorter than the old route

The Cut-Off was a scenic highlight for passenger trains. Early in the 20th century, the DL&W's woman in white, Phoebe Snow, was featured in a poster that touted the new line and the Pequest Fill. The Lackawanna Limited, the railroad's premier train into the early diesel era of the late 1940s, was later joined by the Pocono Express, the Owl, and the Twilight. The Lackawanna operated mainline passenger trains between Hoboken, New Jersey, and Buffalo, New York, where passengers could transfer to and from other railroads. For example, the Nickel Plate offered through sleeper service to St. Louis and Kansas City, Missouri.

In 1949, the Lackawanna began to replace steam engines with diesels, starting with mainline passenger trains. Three years later, the railroad began modernizing its mainline passenger coaches. The Lackawanna Limited was modernized and renamed the Phoebe Snow, helping breathe freshness into a passenger train program that had seen only modest improvements since the 1930s. The Phoebe Snow would run for 11 years as a DL&W train and then as an Erie Lackawanna train from 1963 until November 1966.

The only station on the Cut-Off at which mainline passenger trains stopped was Blairstown, which was also the first stop on westbound trains where passengers were permitted to disembark (i.e., westbound passengers boarding and detraining east of Blairstown were required to use suburban train service instead). Blairstown was the first stop listed on the destination board at the boarding gate at Hoboken for trains traveling via Scranton. In later years, Blairstown had a somewhat unusual facet of operation: any trains arriving after the station agent went home for the night would automatically activate the station platform lights as the train entered the signal block. This practice was abandoned after passenger service ended.

The Lake Cities, a former Erie Railroad train, became the last regularly scheduled passenger train on the Cut-Off, and made its final run on January 6, 1970.

==== Freight ====
Besides cutting travel time, the Cut-Off required fewer engines to pull eastbound freights up to the summit at Port Morris. For westbound freights, the challenge was keeping trains from going too fast. Initially, no speed limit existed on the Cut-Off, with engineers (both freight and passenger) being expected to exercise "good judgment". By the 1920s, however, most freights were restricted to 50 mph (80 km/h) or less, depending on the priority of the train and the type of locomotive and rail cars. By 1943, 131-pound-per-yard (65 kg/m) rail had been installed on the Cut-Off, which permitted fast freights to run at 60 mph (97 km/h) through the Erie Lackawanna years. After Conrail took over operations in 1976, the speed limit was decreased to 50 mph.

Local freights served customers at all three stations on the Cut-Off. Over the years, Blairstown handled the most local freight. The Johnsonburg creamery, built in anticipation of the opening of the line, served local dairy farmers for years. Another creamery, an ice house, and a stock yard were built at Greendell. The final local shipment was shipped in 1978 by Conrail: cattle feed for a customer in Johnsonburg that was delivered to Greendell, as the siding at Johnsonburg no longer existed.

==== Accidents ====
There were two accidents on the Cut-Off:

- On September 17, 1929, at 6:31 a.m., an eastbound extra freight consisting of 47 cars and a caboose was rammed from behind by a deadhead freight of 24 empty express refrigerator cars and a coach. The engineer at fault was reportedly eating his lunch as his train passed a "restricted speed" signal. He also missed two track torpedoes that exploded as his engine ran over them, and then missed the red signal near the west portal of Roseville Tunnel. His train emerged from the tunnel at 30 mph (48 km/h) and rear-ended a freight train traveling about 11 mph (18 km/h). The impact derailed the trailing locomotive and its coal tender, the caboose of the leading freight, and two express cars in the trailing freight. The two cars immediately in front of the caboose were also damaged. Four employees were injured.
- In 1960, a freight train of boxcars derailed at Greendell.

There were three other accidents that did not occur on the Cut-Off itself but indirectly involved it:

- The Rockport train wreck occurred on June 16, 1925, when an eastbound passenger special from Chicago scheduled to run over the Cut-Off was rerouted over the Old Road to avoid freight traffic. A storm had washed debris onto the Hazen Road grade crossing three miles (4.8 km) west of Hackettstown, New Jersey, and at 2:24 a.m., the engine and train derailed. Forty-seven people died, most of them scalded by steam escaping the wrecked locomotive.
- On May 15, 1948, at 11:27 p.m., a westbound passenger train, No. 9, derailed at the 40 mph (64 km/h) curve at Point of Gap while going faster than 73 mph (117 km/h). It was a misty night and the train had left Hoboken 38 minutes late and had made up 14 minutes on the schedule by the time it was recorded as having passed Slateford Tower, suggesting that the train may have exceeded the speed limit during the 75-mile (121 km) trip. The engine (No. 1136, a 4-6-2) and tender overturned and ended upright in the Delaware River. The first car uncoupled from the tender and ended up in the river behind it. The remaining seven cars of the train continued for another 1,735 feet (529 m) down the track. The engineer and firemen were killed.
- On August 10, 1958, shortly after 6:00 am, a string of 14 cars – cement cars, boxcars, and a caboose – broke loose from Port Morris, beginning one of the longest runaways in North American railroading history. The crew of the East End Drill was awaiting orders to move the cars when they began to drift westbound down the grade. Engineless, the cars ran through a switch and onto the eastbound track of the Cut-Off, beginning a 29-mile (47 km) journey that reached a top speed that was estimated to be nearly 80 mph (130 km/h). A chase locomotive was dispatched from Port Morris in a futile attempt to try to catch the cars. Within a half-hour ten of the cars in the string had derailed at the sharp (40 mph or 64 km/h) curve at Point of Gap in the Delaware Water Gap, falling into the Delaware River at approximately the same location as the 1948 accident. The lead caboose and three cars did not derail, however, and travelled another four miles before stopping. No one was injured, although an eastbound freight (NE-4) quickly took Greendell siding just ahead of the runaway cars, narrowly avoiding a catastrophic collision. The runaway was blamed on a worker who had not properly set the brakes.

=== Decline (1958–1979) ===
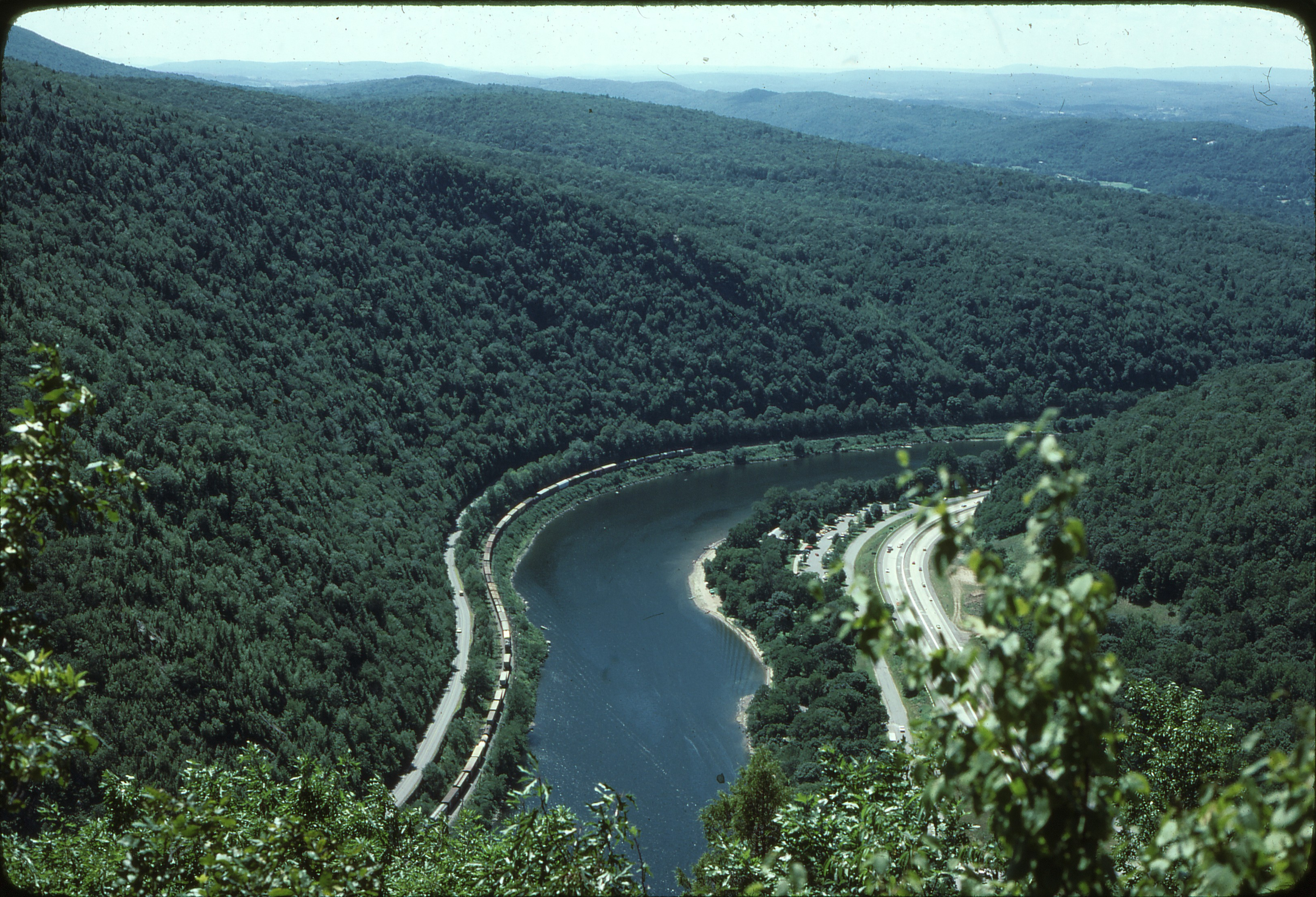
Westbound Conrail freight through the Delaware Water Gap, just north of Slateford Junction, in a summer of 1977 photo taken from Mount Tammany

The DL&W was one of the most profitable corporations in the U.S. when it built the Cut-Off. That profitability declined sharply after World War II, leading to the 1960 merger with the Erie Railroad. DL&W single-tracked the Cut-Off in 1958 in anticipation of the Erie merger. The westbound track was removed, leaving a four-mile (6.4 km) passing siding at Greendell and shorter sidings at Port Morris and Slateford. After the merger, most freight traffic shifted to the Erie's mainline through Port Jervis, New York. With the cessation of passenger service in 1970, the Cut-Off became relatively quiet for several years. In 1972, the CNJ abandoned operations in Pennsylvania, causing through freights to be run daily between Elizabeth, New Jersey, and Scranton, using the Cut-Off and the CNJ's High Bridge Branch. (This arrangement with the CNJ would end on April 1, 1976, with the creation of Conrail). As such, when Penn Central closed its Maybrook, New York Yard in 1970, and its ex-New York, New Haven and Hartford Railroad Poughkeepsie Bridge burned on May 8, 1974, the original reason for using the "Erie side" suddenly no longer existed. As a result, the EL looked to upgrade the "Scranton side", and by 1974 nearly all EL freights had been re-routed to the Scranton Division via the Cut-Off.

After Conrail took over, existing labor contracts kept EL's freight schedule largely unchanged. The railroad replaced many rotted ties, returning it to better physical condition. But Conrail eventually shifted all freight traffic to other routes, citing the grades over the Pocono Mountains and EL's early-1960s severing of the Boonton Branch near Paterson, New Jersey. Conrail ran its final through freights via the Cut-Off on November 16, 1978, and used it to move a light engine from Croxton Yard to Scranton two days later. In early January 1979, the line was placed out of service and Port Morris Tower closed. Routine maintenance on the line ceased, and the signal system was shut off. Scranton-Slateford freights continued running until 1980, when coal deliveries to the Metropolitan Edison power plant in Portland, Pennsylvania, shifted from the Scranton Division to the former Bangor & Portland Railway.

=== Preservation and service restoration (1979–present) ===
Efforts to preserve the Cut-Off began shortly after Conrail ended service on it in 1979. An Amtrak inspection train ran on November 13 of that year, and counties in New Jersey and Pennsylvania made attempts to acquire the line. Nevertheless, Conrail removed the tracks on the Cut-Off in 1984, and in the following year sold the right-of-way to two land developers: Jerry Turco and Burton Goldmeier. In 2001, the State of New Jersey acquired the right-of-way through eminent domain for $21 million. The short section in Pennsylvania was conveyed to the Monroe County Railroad Authority, which joined with Lackawanna County to become the Pennsylvania Northeast Regional Railroad Authority. Subsequent federal studies conducted on the Cut-Off and the mainline into Pennsylvania found a need to restore passenger service.

In 2011, after a nearly three-decade effort to reactivate the line, NJ Transit launched the $61 million Lackawanna Cut-Off Restoration Project. The first phase will link Port Morris Junction to Andover, New Jersey (Andover station), 7.3 miles (11.7 km) away. By December 2011, about 1 mile (1.6 km) of track had been installed from Port Morris Junction west to Stanhope, New Jersey. Work was delayed by various environmental and land-use issues, all of which have been resolved. As of 2022, about 4.25 miles (6.84 km) of rail, in three unconnected sections, has been laid between Port Morris and Lake Lackawanna, and most of the right-of-way between Port Morris Junction and the lake had been cleared of trees and debris. Work on the Roseville Tunnel, a two-year project, was approved by the NJ Transit Board of Directors on April 13, 2022, and a Notice to Proceed on the project was announced by NJ Transit on September 8, 2022. Commuter operations are expected to begin no earlier than 2026.

== See also ==
- Pennsylvania Northeast Regional Railroad Authority
