= William Truesdale =

American railroad executive

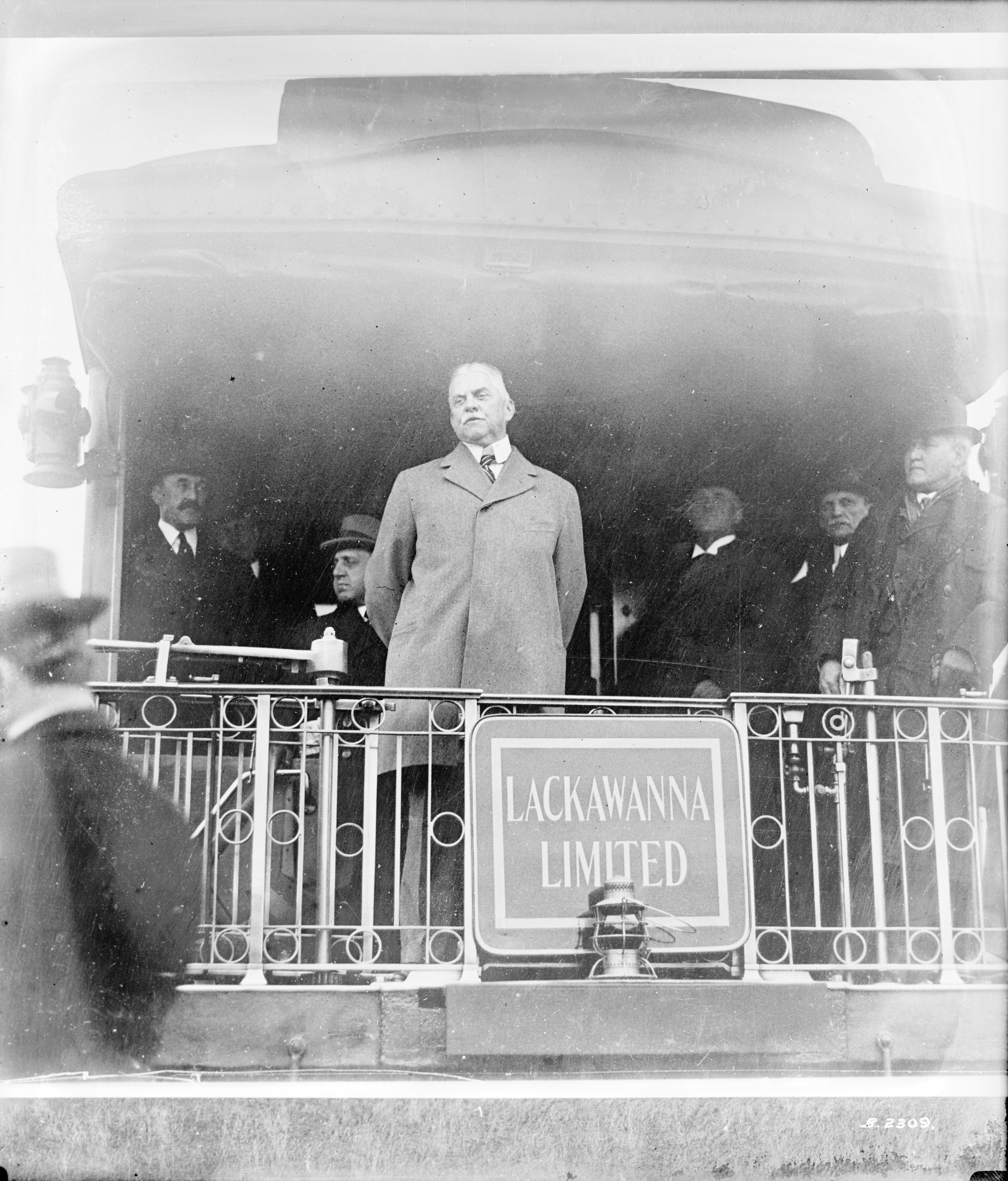
- Truesdale speaking in 1915
- Born: December 1, 1851; Youngstown, Ohio
- Died: June 2, 1935 (aged 83); Greenwich, Connecticut
- Occupation: Railroad executive
- Spouse: Annie Topping
- Children: 2 sons, 1 daughter

William Haynes Truesdale (1851–1935) was an American railroad executive. He served as the president of the Delaware, Lackawanna and Western Railroad (DL&W) from 1899 to 1925.

== Early life ==
Truesdale was born on December 1, 1851, in Youngstown, Ohio. He was the oldest of Calvin and Charlotte (Haynes) Truesdale's four children. He was educated in Rock Island, Illinois.

== Career ==
Truesdale began his career as a clerk with the Rockford, Rock Island and St. Louis Railway in 1869. In 1876, he was hired as passenger and freight agent for the Logansport division of the Terre Haute and Indianapolis Railroad, with offices in Terre Haute, Indiana. In 1881, Truesdale accepted a job as traffic manager of the Chicago, St. Paul, Minneapolis and Omaha Railway and later became vice president. In 1887, he was hired as the president of the Minneapolis and St. Louis Railway. Following a brief tenure in this role, Truesdale served as the first vice president and general manager of the Chicago, Rock Island and Pacific Railroad, a position he kept through the last decade of the 19th century.

Truesdale became president of the DL&W in March 1899, replacing an ailing Samuel Sloan. He immediately cemented his reputation as a relentless visionary by launching one of the most ambitious railroad modernization programs in American history. Until the dawn of the twentieth century, the DL&W — like most railroads dealing with adverse geography — generally followed the contours of the land when laying track. Steep climbs and long hours aboard a train remained commonplace. Truesdale's efforts to rebuild his 900-mile system set the standard for U.S. rail construction. Heavier bridges and track were installed to permit heavier locomotives and cars to travel over them faster. Dozens of new stations were built. Many curves were straightened. Where conditions demanded, entire stretches of track were replaced by new alignments.

One example was the Lackawanna Cut-off, a 28.45-mile (45.79 km) stretch of fast track with no grade crossings. Built to replace the DL&W's "Old Road", this enormous construction project involved huge amounts of cut and fill through the Pequest Valley of northwest New Jersey. It shortened the route by only 11 miles, but enabled trains to travel at speeds approaching 100 miles an hour. (The Cut-off was eventually decommissioned by Conrail and abandoned in 1983. The state of New Jersey later purchased the abandoned corridor and began reconstruction in 2011 to host New Jersey Transit commuter trains.) Under Truesdale's leadership, the railroad also built the Nicholson Cutoff north of Scranton, including the Tunkhannock Viaduct, the world's largest concrete bridge and one of its largest concrete structures. The Tunkhannock Viaduct is still in use.

DL&W launched its Phoebe Snow marketing campaign, one of the best-known in American advertising, in 1902, shortly after Truesdale became president. The campaign built its name-branded character upon the reputation for clean operations cultivated by Truesdale.

Truesdale retired as DL&W president in 1925, but remained chairman of the board until 1931.

== Personal life and death ==
Truesdale married Annie Topping on October 2, 1878. She was the daughter of Lt. Col. Melville Douglas Topping, who was killed August 20, 1862, at the Battle of Richmond, Kentucky, while commanding the 71st Indiana Regiment. They had two sons, Calvin and Melville, and a daughter, who married Richard M. Bissell. Truesdale resided in Greenwich, Connecticut, and he was predeceased by his wife.

Truesdale "suffered from a breakdown" in 1931. He died of bronchial pneumonia on June 2, 1935, in Greenwich at 83.

In his obituary, the New York Times described him as "a militant, hard-hitting and hard-working champion of the railroads against the constantly increasing demands of legislators and labor leaders alike. He opposed wage increases and eight-hour laws on the ground that they increased costs of operation without apprarently increasing operating efficiency, and he opposed the legislative restrictions placed upon railroads on the ground that they constituted interference."

== See also ==
- List of railroad executives

== Sources ==
- Taber, Thomas Townsend (1977). The Delaware, Lackawanna & Western Railroad in the Nineteenth Century. Muncy, Pennsylvania: Privately printed. OCLC 9846964.
- Taber, Thomas Townsend; Taber, Thomas Townsend III (1980). The Delaware, Lackawanna & Western Railroad in the Twentieth Century. Vol. 1. Muncy, PA: Privately printed. ISBN 0-9603398-2-5.
- Taber, Thomas Townsend; Taber, Thomas Townsend III (1981). The Delaware, Lackawanna & Western Railroad in the Twentieth Century. Vol. 2. Muncy, PA: Privately printed. ISBN 0-9603398-3-3.
