= Slateford, Pennsylvania =

Unincorporated community in Pennsylvania, United States

Coordinates: 40°56′46″N 75°06′51″W

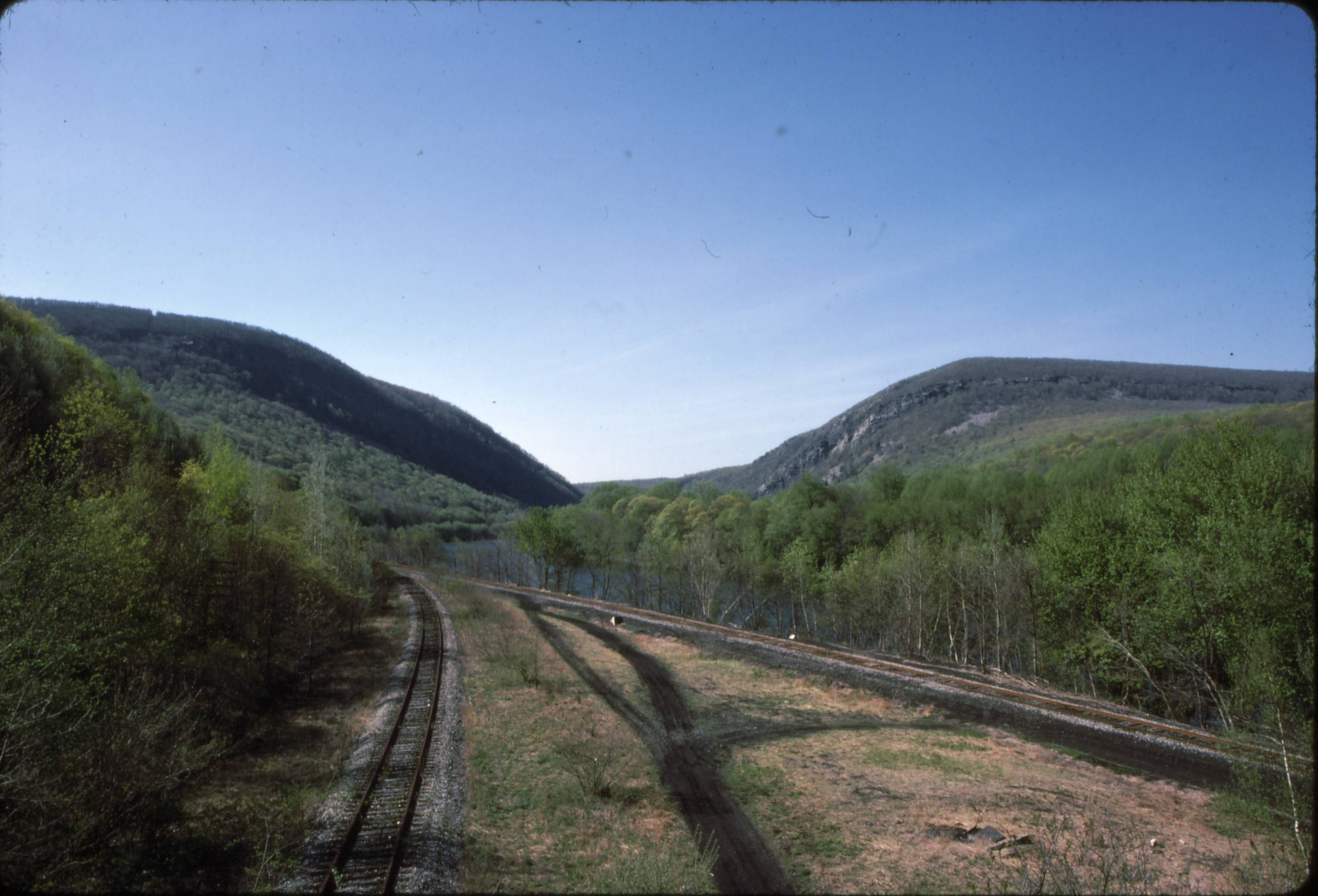
Slateford Junction looking north to the Delaware Water Gap, where the Lackawanna Cut-Off on the left and the Old Road on the right converge about 1,500 feet (460 m) past Slateford Tower

Slateford is an unincorporated community that is located in Northampton County, Pennsylvania. It is part of the Lehigh Valley metropolitan area, which has a population of 861,899 and is the 68th-most populous metropolitan area in the U.S. as of the 2020 census.

== History ==
The name of this Pennsylvania town was derived from its location at the edge of the Northampton Slate Belt. Slate production began in the area as early as 1808, making it one of the earliest such sites in the United States. Immigrants from Wales and England came to this community during the nineteenth century to work in the quarries. Quarries and slate production factories operated in the area until 1917.

== Geography ==
The nearest communities are Stroudsburg to the north and Portland to the south. Slateford, which is located approximately one mile (1.4 km) from the Delaware Water Gap, is part of the Lehigh Valley metropolitan area.

Slateford is the location of Slateford Junction, the connection between the Lackawanna Railroad's old mainline and the Lackawanna Cut-Off.
