= Andover station (NJ Transit) =

Planned NJ Transit Rail Station

Andover
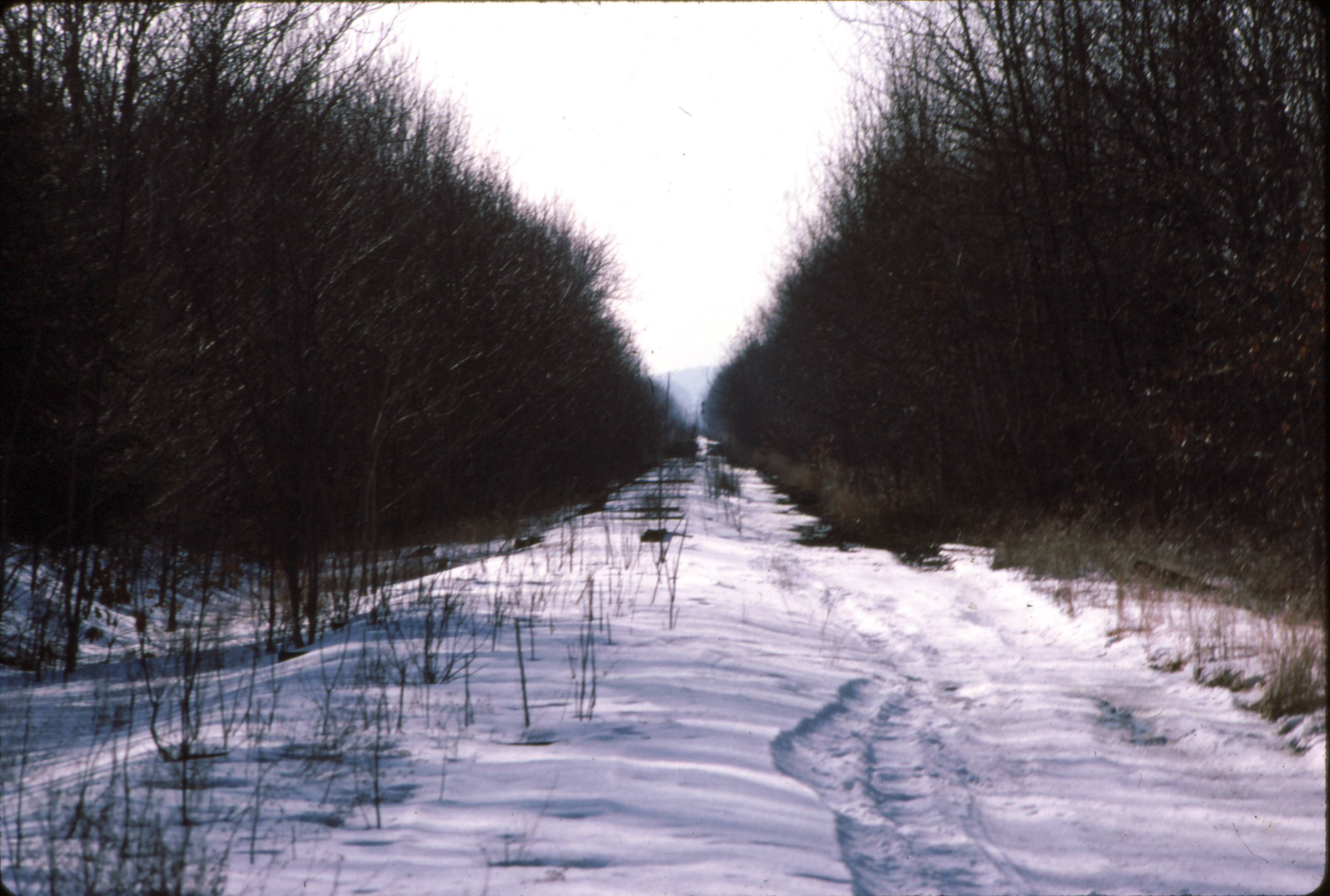
- Looking west to the Pequest Fill, the planned Andover station would serve the restored Lackawanna Cut-Off line.

General information
- Location: Roseville Road, Andover Township, New Jersey
- Coordinates: 40°58′53″N 74°43′49″W
- Owner: State of New Jersey
- Line: Lackawanna Cut-Off
- Platforms: 1 side platform (planned)
- Tracks: 0 (1 planned)

Construction
- Parking: 65 spaces (initial opening), 125 spaces (planned)

Other information
- Fare zone: 19

History
- Opening: 2026 (planned)

Future services
Preceding station	NJ Transit	Following station
Blairstown toward Scranton	Lackawanna Cut-Off Proposed	Lake Hopatcong toward New York or Hoboken
Location

Andover is a planned New Jersey Transit passenger railroad station in Andover Township, in Sussex County, New Jersey, United States, providing service on its Lackawanna Cut-Off line. The line remains under construction. The station will be built at a site on Andover's Roseville Road, about 1.1 miles (1.8 km) from U.S. Route 206 and about 0.9 miles (1.4 km) from County Route 517. On the rail line, it will be located about 7.3 miles (11.7 km) west of Port Morris Junction.

Anticipated construction at the site includes a station and platform between the track and Roseville Road with 65 parking spaces initially, with room to expand to 125 spaces. Preparation to restore trackage between Port Morris and Andover was originally to begin in 2010 but was delayed until early 2011 due to a dispute over the exact location of the Andover Station area. Another delay was caused while environmental permits were sought. In August 2017, an agreement with a local landowner appeared to have cleared the way for the necessary environmental permits. At the time, service was projected to start in 2020, though in March 2020 it was pushed back to 2025, and was later delayed to Fall 2026.

The Andover station will be the terminus of the line upon its planned opening, but plans exist for restoring the Lackawanna Cut-Off line west of Andover as far as Scranton.

== History ==
=== Early history ===
From 1908 to 1911, the Delaware, Lackawanna and Western Railroad (DL&W) built a level-graded 28.5-mile (45.9 km) railroad line. This route, known as the Lackawanna Cut-Off, ran west from Port Morris Junction in Roxbury Township near the south end of Lake Hopatcong in northwestern New Jersey (about 45 miles (72 km) west-northwest of New York City) and to Slateford Junction near the Delaware Water Gap in northeastern Pennsylvania. With its rural landscape, tall fills, deep rock cuts, and two large viaducts, the line became renowned as a scenic highlight of the railroad's main line between Hoboken, New Jersey, and Buffalo, New York. Through the use of fewer and less-sharp curves, no steep hills, and no grade crossings, the route was faster and 11 miles (18 kilometres) shorter than the Lackawanna Old Road, the rail line it replaced. The DL&W constructed structures on the new line of reinforced concrete, and the roadbed required the movement of millions of tons of fill material using techniques similar to those on the Panama Canal.

The Cut-Off route passed through Andover Township in northwestern New Jersey's Sussex County between Greendell Station in Green Township and the Roseville Tunnel in Byram Township. It did not stop in Andover at this time and passed over rail lines operated by the Lehigh and Hudson River Railway and the Sussex Branch, and over U.S. Route 206 and county roads.

The Lackawanna Cut-Off route opened for passenger service on December 24, 1911, and was operated by the Lackawanna Railroad until October 17, 1960, when the Lackawanna merged with the Erie Railroad. The resulting Erie Lackawanna Railroad (EL) operated the line until April 1, 1976, when the EL was conveyed into Conrail, which would operate it until January 1979. The line was abandoned in 1983 and the track was removed the following year. Conrail sold the right-of-way to two land developers in 1985, and the State of New Jersey acquired it in 2001.

=== Planning and restoration ===
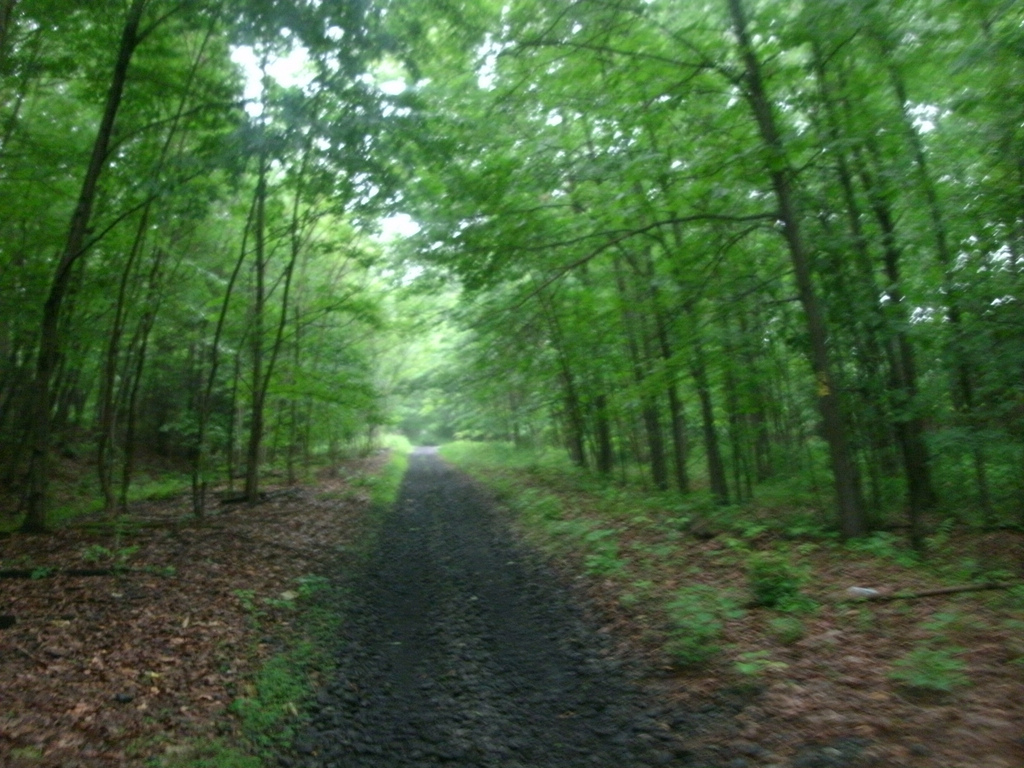
The site for the proposed Andover station in June 2011

New Jersey Transit's Board of Directors authorized consultant work for conceptual design, completion of the environmental assessment (EA) and preparation of the documentation required by the Federal Transit Administration for new transit lines to open service to northwestern New Jersey and northeastern Pennsylvania. The State of New Jersey completed the purchase of the Lackawanna Cut-Off right-of-way and property within the state in May 2001.

In May 2008, the North Jersey Transportation Planning Authority (NJTPA) approved funding to rebuild the first segment of track for restored service along the Cut-Off route between Andover and Port Morris Junction. After review of the submitted environmental assessment, the Federal Transit Administration issued a Finding of No Significant Impact (FONSI) for the first phase of the project to Andover on September 12, 2008. Preparation to restore trackage between Port Morris and Andover was originally slated to begin in 2010 but was delayed until early 2011 due to environmental concerns and questions over the exact location of the Andover Station area. In September 2011, the first new track was laid at Port Morris; three months later, Norfolk Southern delivered 7.5 miles (12.1 km) of continuously welded rail to Port Morris, enough to re-lay a single track to Andover. As of 2021, much of the right-of-way between Port Morris and Lake Lackawanna had been cleared of trees and debris. A total of 4.25 miles (6.84 km) of track has been laid west of Port Morris Junction in three disconnected sections.

As of 2021, New Jersey Transit intends to resume rail service between Andover and Hoboken, New Jersey and to New York Penn Station via transfer to Midtown Direct service, by connecting to the existing NJT Montclair-Boonton Line and Morris & Essex Lines. Service is projected to start in 2026. Construction began in 2011 to restore passenger service in phases, and the first phase includes opening service along 7.3-mile (11.7 km) of track to Andover. Extension of service via Amtrak has also been proposed, including the potential of restoring service to Blairstown, New Jersey, and stations in Pennsylvania with a proposed terminus in Scranton, Pennsylvania.

On April 13, 2022, the NJ Transit board announced the approval of an approximated $32.5 million contract for completion of repairs to the Roseville Tunnel and construction of the new Andover station. It is widely anticipated that work will be completed in the latter part of 2026.

=== Construction ===
A disagreement over the replacement of a culvert on private property near the proposed station has delayed progress on the resumption of construction., but as of early August 2017, an agreement has been made to replace the culvert with the property owner and continue building track to Andover.
