= Port Morris, New Jersey =

Populated place in Morris County, New Jersey, US

- Census-designated place
- Location in Morris County Location in New Jersey Location in the United States
- Coordinates: 40°54′18″N 74°41′06″W
- Country: United States
- State: New Jersey
- County: Morris
- Township: Roxbury

Area
  - Total: 0.36 sq mi (0.92 km^{2})
  - Land: 0.25 sq mi (0.64 km^{2})
  - Water: 0.11 sq mi (0.29 km^{2})
- Elevation: 896 ft (273 m)

Population (2020)
  - Total: 754
  - Density: 3,069.3/sq mi (1,185.06/km^{2})
- Time zone: UTC−05:00 (Eastern (EST))
  - Summer (DST): UTC−04:00 (Eastern (EDT))
- ZIP Code: 07850 (Landing)
- FIPS code: 34-60390
- GNIS feature ID: 0879439

Port Morris is a historic unincorporated community and census-designated place (CDP) in Roxbury Township, Morris County, New Jersey, United States. The community is in the hills of New Jersey's Skylands Region, on the shores of Lake Musconetcong.

As of the 2020 census, the community's population was 754.

== History ==
In the 1820s, George P. Macculloch envisioned a canal that would transport Pennsylvania coal to New York City. The plan was to construct a canal from Phillipsburg, New Jersey, at the confluence of the Delaware and Lehigh rivers, near the coal fields, to Newark, Jersey City, or New York City. The Morris Canal was completed to Newark in 1831, and Port Morris become one of the major stops established along the route of the canal.

With the rise of the railroad came the demise of canals. Despite the changeover in transportation methods, Port Morris found a new role. With the construction of the Lackawanna Cut-Off by the Delaware, Lackawanna and Western Railroad between 1908 and 1911, Port Morris became a major railroad junction and the starting point of the cutoff.

== Geography ==
Port Morris is in western Morris County, along the northwestern edge of Roxbury Township. It is bordered to the east by the unincorporated community of Landing and to the west by the borough of Netcong. Lake Musconetcong and its inflow, the Musconetcong River, form the northern edge of the community. The Sussex County line follows the thread of the river and the passes through the center of the lake, with the borough of Stanhope to the north.

According to the U.S. Census Bureau, the Port Morris CDP has a total area of 0,357 square miles (924.63 km^{2}), of which 0.246 square miles (0.637 km^{2}) are land and 0.111 square miles (0.287 km^{2}), or 31.1%, are water, comprising the southern part of Lake Musconetcong.

== Demographics ==
Historical population
Census	Pop.	Note	%±
2020	754		—
U.S. Decennial Census; 2020

Port Morris was first listed as a census-designated place prior to the 2020 census.

Port Morris CDP, New Jersey – Racial and ethnic composition Note: the US Census treats Hispanic/Latino as an ethnic category. This table excludes Latinos from the racial categories and assigns them to a separate category. Hispanics/Latinos may be of any race.
Race / Ethnicity (NH = Non-Hispanic)	Pop 2020	2020
White alone (NH)	482	63.93%
Black or African American alone (NH)	36	4.77%
Native American or Alaska Native alone (NH)	0	0.00%
Asian alone (NH)	36	4.77%
Native Hawaiian or Pacific Islander alone (NH)	0	0.00%
Other race alone (NH)	4	0.53%
Mixed race or Multiracial (NH)	27	3.58%
Hispanic or Latino (any race)	169	22.41%
Total	754	100.00%
