= Walter H. Gahagan =

American engineer

- Born: February 14, 1864; Troy, Ohio, U.S.
- Died: December 18, 1930 (aged 66); Brooklyn, New York, U.S.
- Spouse: Lillian Rose Mussen (m. 1896)
- Children: 5, including Helen

Walter Hamer Gahagan (February 14, 1864 – December 18, 1930) was an American civil engineer and general contractor who owned a construction business based in Brooklyn, New York, and a shipyard in Arverne, Queens. Among other projects, his firm worked on the Lackawanna Cut-Off, an immense railroad project in northwestern New Jersey.

== Personal ==
Born in Troy, Ohio, In 1896, Gahagan married Lillian Rose Mussen, a schoolteacher who had grown up in Wisconsin. They moved to Brooklyn the following year and soon had twin boys, Frederick Mussen and William Corthell. In the summer of 1900, the family moved temporarily to Boonton, New Jersey, where Gahagan's company was building a reservoir. Their daughter, Helen, later an actress and politician, was born on November 20, just before the family moved back to Brooklyn. In 1902, another daughter, Lillian, was born, and the family moved to a large brownstone house at 231 Lincoln Place in Brooklyn's Park Slope neighborhood. In 1910, their last child, Walter Jr., was born. In 1914, Gahagan bought a vacation home in Fairlee, Vermont, and the family thereafter spent parts of each summer there. When Gahagan died at his home in Brooklyn on December 18, 1930 at age 66, the family was living at 17 Prospect Park West.

Helen Gahagan became an actress and a pioneering politician who served as a three-term U.S. Representative from California. In 1950, she lost the race for U.S. Senate to Richard Nixon.

Walter Gahagan Jr. (1910-1993) graduated from Princeton University in 1932 and Columbia University law school in 1935, competed in discus and exhibition football at the 1932 Summer Olympics in Los Angeles, then inherited the family business, which subsequently helped build the launching pad for the Apollo space missions and Kennedy and Newark airports.

== Businesses ==
Gahagan founded his contracting business in 1899 and by 1924 owned two companies, W.H. Gahagan, Inc., and Gahagan Dredging, Inc., which employed between 100 and 4,000 people, depending on contracts, and which owned and operated dredges, steam shovels, and at least 10 steam locomotives — six Ten-Wheelers and four 0-4-0 switchers. Between 1908 and 1911, Gahagan's firm was one of seven contractors who built the Lackawanna Cut-Off.

In 1918, Gahagan built a shipyard on Jamaica Bay on a plot of land measuring 600 by 2,000 feet "between Seaview [today, Beach 63rd Street] and Adah [today, DeCosta] avenues" in Arverne's Somerville Park neighborhood. The facilities included a sawmill measuring 600 by 200 feet, various auxiliary shops, 1,000 feet of launching ways, and 1.5 miles of rail siding that was laid by the Long Island Rail Road. A news report published before the yard's opening said that construction would take 30 days, that the yard would employ about 250 people, and that its first contract was a U.S. government order for 30 barges of 100 feet in length and 32 feet abeam. Among the other work done by the Arverne shipyard was the construction of a 10,000-ton floating wooden drydock for $800,000 for the Emergency Fleet Corporation.
