= Port Morris Junction =

Coordinates: 40.90769°N 74.66968°W

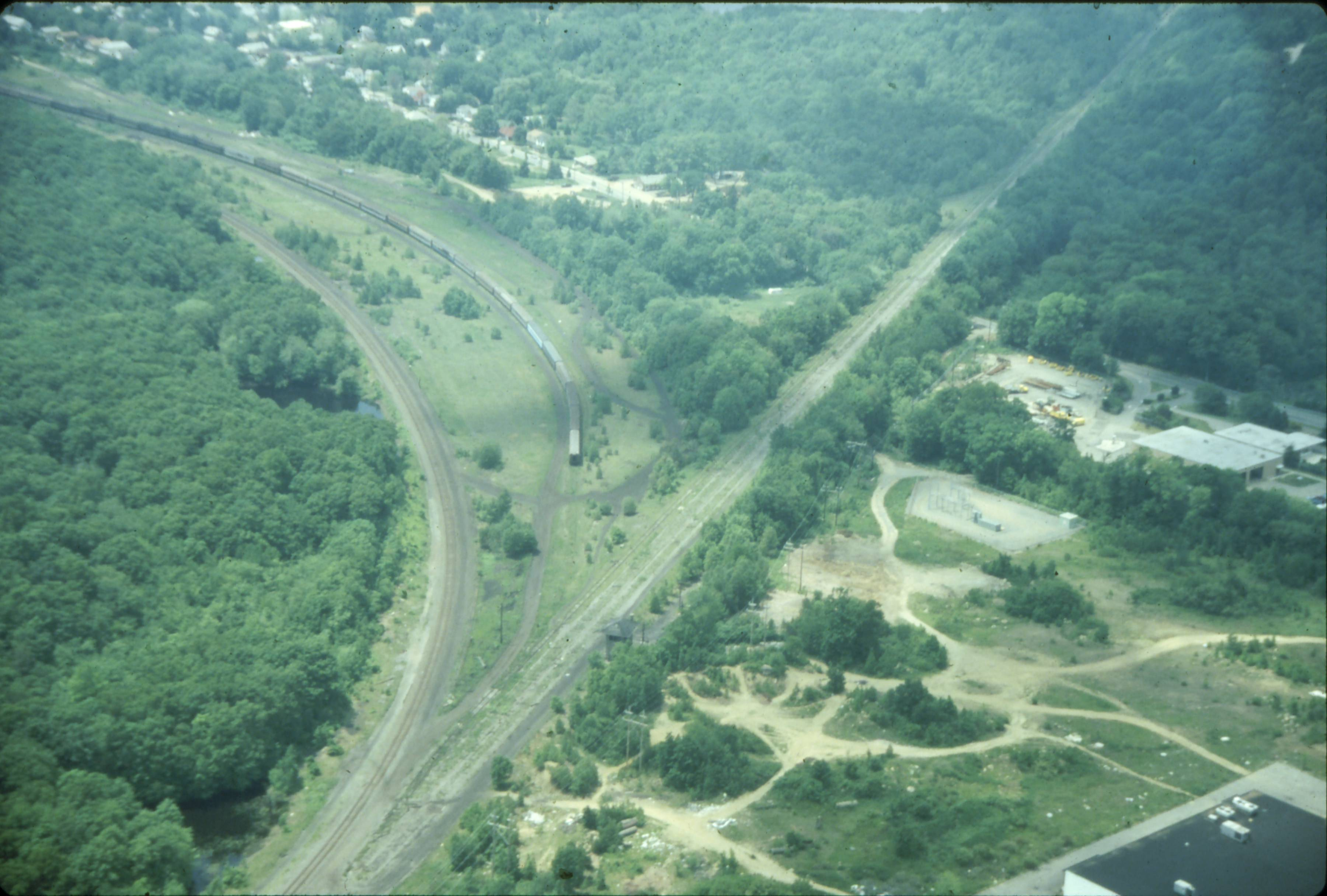
Port Morris Junction and Port Morris railyard in 1985. The Lackawanna Cut-Off goes straight toward the upper right, while NJ Transit's Montclair-Boonton Line to Hackettstown, New Jersey, curves off to the left.

Port Morris Junction is the railroad connection between NJ Transit's Montclair-Boonton Line and the Lackawanna Cut-Off. Opened in 1911 by the Lackawanna Railroad, it is in the Port Morris, New Jersey section of Roxbury Township, New Jersey, south of Lake Hopatcong.

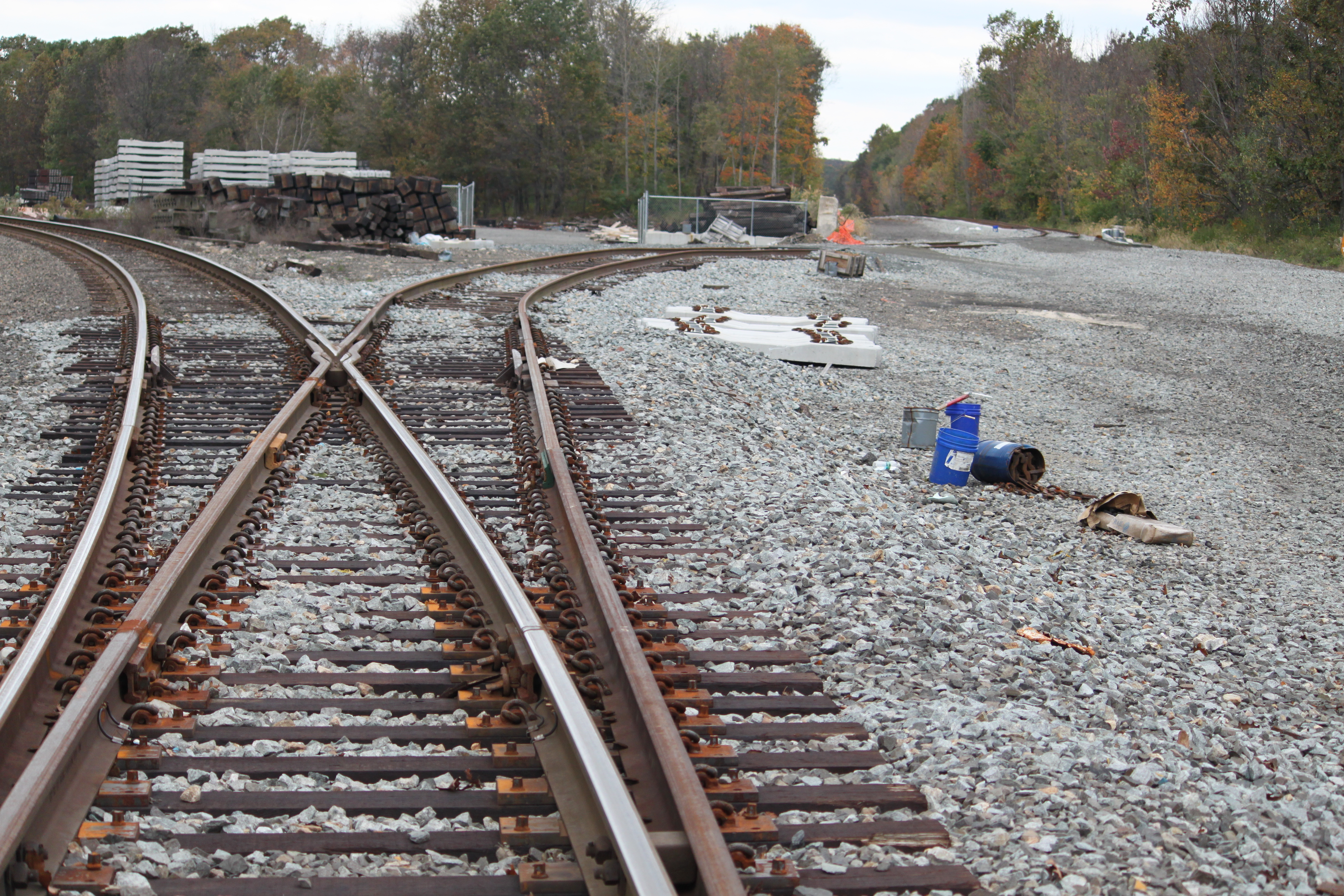
A temporary connection between NJ Transit's Montclair-Boonton Line, left, joins the Lackawanna Cut-Off at Port Morris Yard. Plans call for the junction to be returned to its historic location about 100 yards (100 m) to the east. When returned to service, it will be known as UN Junction after the former call letters of Port Morris Tower.

== History ==
Soon after rail service began in the 1850s, the Lackawanna Railroad built a rail yard on the east side of the Morris Canal. The yard was initially used to shift coal from railcars to canal barges. By the turn of the 20th century, however, the canal was little used (it would be abandoned in 1924) and the yard was used primarily to store freight cars. As Lackawanna officials planned a route to shorten travel time from New York City to Buffalo, New York, the yard offered a compelling reason to begin the Cut-Off at Port Morris.

Port Morris Tower opened on December 23, 1911, and the first train to use the Cut-Off passed shortly after midnight the following morning. Port Morris Junction was part of the Lackawanna until October 17, 1960; the Erie Lackawanna Railroad until April 1, 1976; and Conrail until February 27, 1979, when the tower was closed. Conrail abandoned the Cut-Off in 1983 and pulled up the tracks at the junction in October 1984.

During 1983, NJ Transit (NJT) had taken over the operation of commuter rail service in New Jersey, including through the old Port Morris Junction area. Later that decade, NJT began operating a rail yard there. Initially, the bridge department began operating out of Port Morris Yard. Then, in the 1990s, a commuter rail yard was built at Port Morris, allowing commuter trainsets to begin their weekday morning eastbound runs at Hackettstown, Mount Olive, Netcong or Lake Hopatcong from the yard rather than the yard in Dover, as had previously been the case. These trains then proceed to Denville where they travel to Hoboken via the Morristown Line or the Montclair-Boonton Line. Connections along the way allow travel to New York City. Westbound travel runs this pattern in reverse. (As of 2018, there was no weekend service west of Dover.)

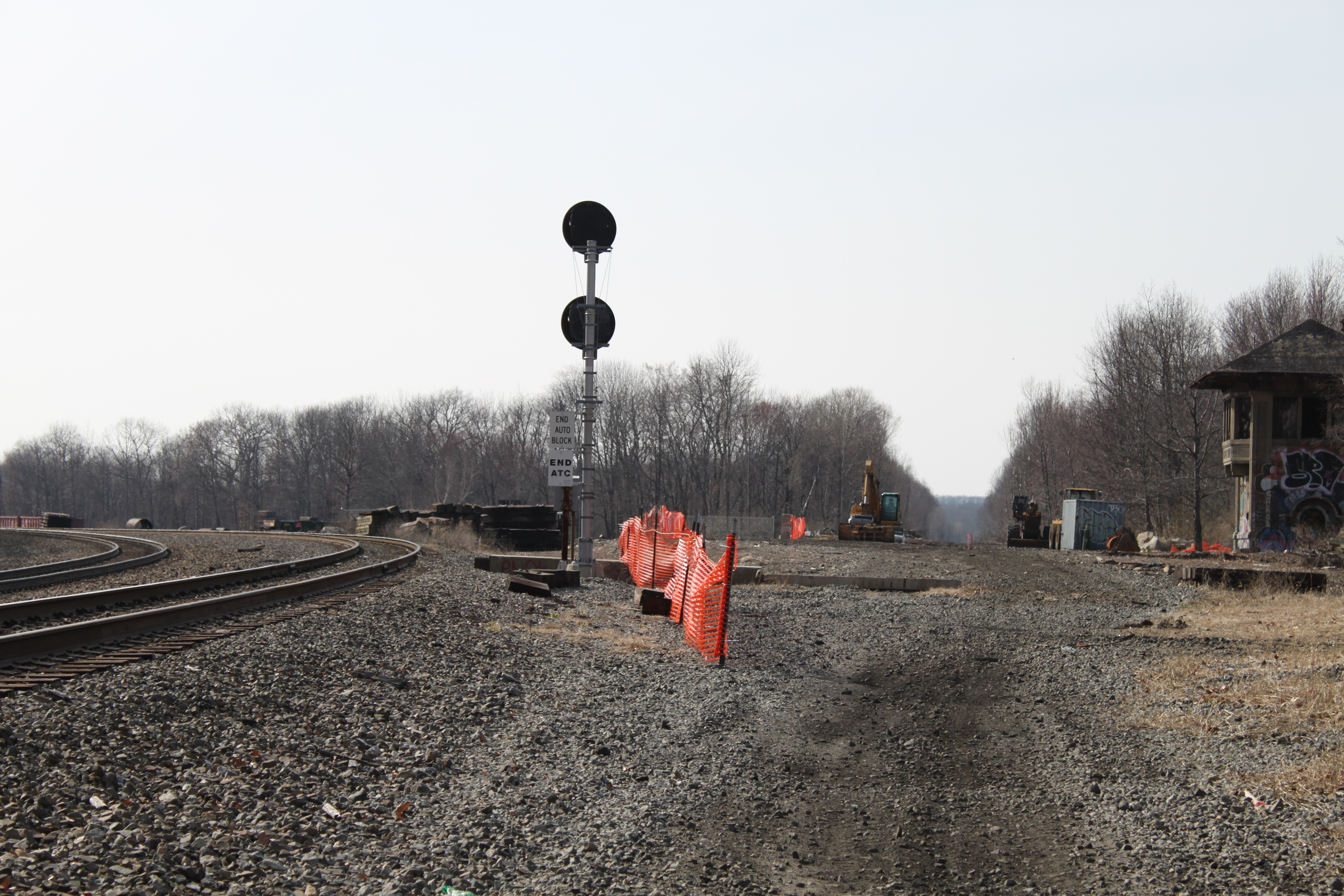
Port Morris Junction on April 9, 2011, looking west-northwest. From left to right: the Montclair-Boonton Line, the track to Port Morris railyard, the signal that controls movements out of the yard, Port Morris Wye (the connection between the Lackawanna Cut-Off and the Port Morris Yard) crossing through the trees about a half-mile (1 km) away, the Cut-Off right-of-way, and Port Morris Tower. The Cut-Off and the Montclair-Boonton Line will be connected behind the photographer.

The junction is to be rebuilt, with tracks being relaid on the Cut-Off for commuter service to Andover, New Jersey, 7.3 miles (11.7 km) northwest of Port Morris Junction. Further reconstruction may extend service to Scranton, Pennsylvania, 88 miles (142 km) from Port Morris. In 2021, Amtrak created a map with future rail corridors on it. Included on this map was service between New York City and Scranton via the Lackawanna Cut-Off.
