= Phoebe Snow (character) =

Fictional character used to promote a railroad

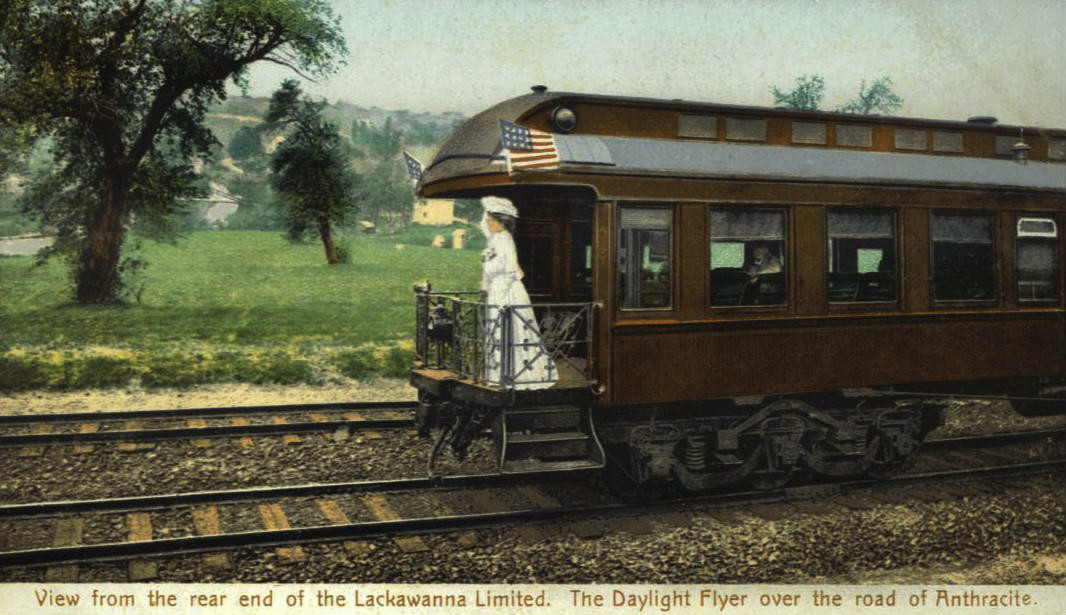
A 1906 postcard promotion for the Lackawanna Limited; Phoebe Snow stands on the observation car platform dressed in white and holding her traditional violet corsage.

Phoebe Snow was a fictional character created by Earnest Elmo Calkins to promote the Delaware, Lackawanna and Western Railroad. The advertising campaign was one of the first to present a fictional character based on a live model.

== Advertising campaign ==
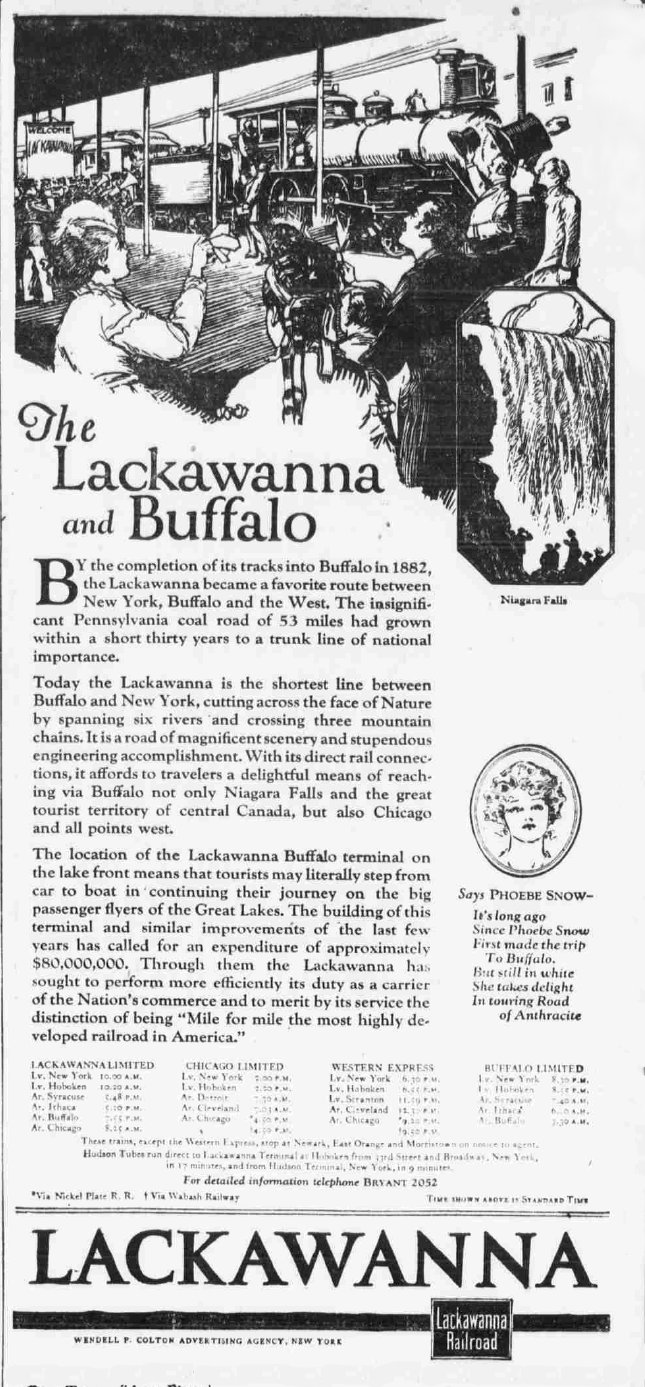
An advertisement for travel along the Lackawanna line in 1922 with a portrait of Phoebe depicted in the lower right

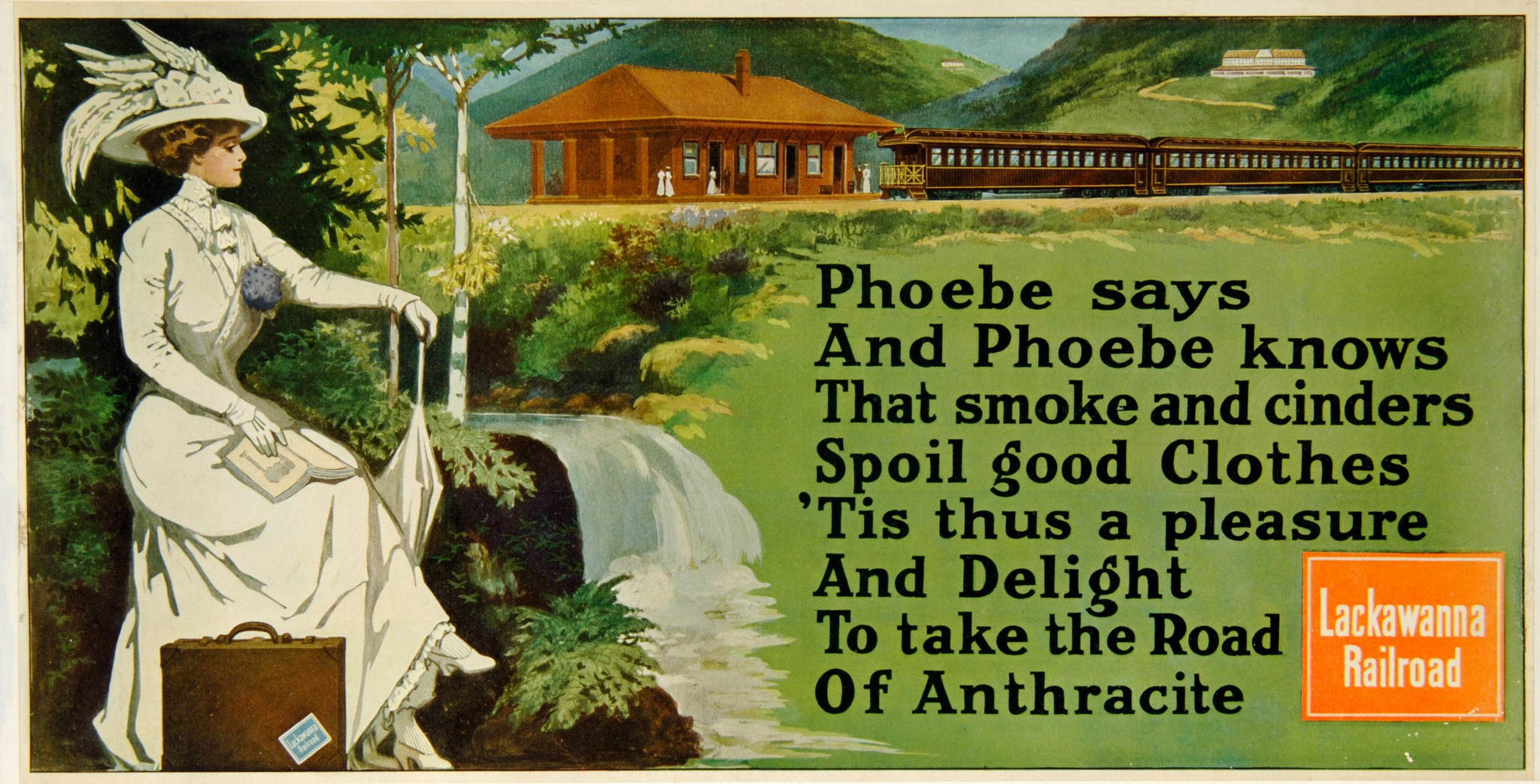
Phoebe Snow advertisement, c. 1912

Rail travel around 1900 was tough on the clothing of passengers. After a long trip on a train hauled by a bituminous coal-fired steam locomotive, travelers would frequently disembark covered with black soot. This usually wasn’t the case when the locomotive burned anthracite, a cleaner-burning type of coal. The Lackawanna owned vast anthracite mines in Pennsylvania, and up until World War I, burned anthracite in their passenger locomotives. Hence the road could legitimately claim that their passengers’ clothing would remain clean after a long trip.

To promote this, the Calkins advertising department created, "Phoebe Snow", described as "a young New York socialite, and a frequent passenger of the Lackawanna." The advertising campaign presented Miss Snow as often traveling to Buffalo, New York, and always wearing a white dress. Calkins said he based the campaign on an earlier series of Lackawanna car cards (advertisements displayed inside coaches) - All in Lawn - created by DL&W advertising manager, Wendell P. Colton. They had been built on a rather limiting nursery rhyme, The House That Jack Built, and featured a nameless heroine dressed in white. For his new campaign, Calkins adopted a form of verse inspired by an onomatopoetic rhyme, Riding on the Rail, that he felt offered endless possibilities.

The first advertisement featured the image of Phoebe Snow and a short poem:

Says Phoebe Snow
about to go
upon a trip to Buffalo
"My gown stays white
from morn till night
Upon the Road of Anthracite"

Phoebe soon became one of the most recognized advertising mascots in the United States, and in further campaigns she began to avail all the benefits offered by DL&W: gourmet food, courteous attendants, an observation deck, even onboard electric lights:

Now Phoebe may
by night or day
enjoy her book upon the way
Electric light
dispels the night
Upon the Road of Anthracite

In 1903, filmmaker Edwin Porter parodied the advertising campaign with his short film A Romance of the Rails.

"Phoebe Snow" was the only name Calkins ever used in the advertisements, and he laughed at later claims by Lackawanna officials that the name was selected only after lengthy scientific experimentation. The original artwork was painted by Henry Stacy Benton, who worked from a series of images of a model, Marion Murray Gorsch. Later, she was photographed in a variety of railroad activities while dressed in a white gown. Standing in for the cool, violet-corsaged Phoebe character of the paintings, Gorsch was one of the first models to be used in advertising.

During World War I, anthracite was needed for the war effort and its use as a fuel by railroads was prohibited, thus ending the career of Phoebe Snow. As she passed into legend, the Calkins heroine said farewell with the following jingle:

Miss Phoebe's trip
without a slip
is almost o'er
Her trunk and grip
are right and tight
without a slight
"Good bye, old Road of Anthracite!"

== Name revival ==
On November 15, 1949, the Lackawanna Railroad inaugurated a new streamlined passenger train named after its long-dormant promotional symbol. The new Phoebe Snow represented the modernization of the Lackawanna passenger train fleet, and its image. The new train became Train No. 3 (westbound) and No. 6 (eastbound), which previously had been assigned to the railroad's formerly premier train, the Lackawanna Limited. The Phoebe Snow ran on a daylight schedule between Hoboken, N.J., and Buffalo, N.Y., a trip of 396 miles (639 km), in about eight hours. The train was discontinued in 1966.

== In popular culture ==
The singer Phoebe Snow (1950-2011) took her stage name from the character.

The 2014 oratorio Anthracite Fields, which commemorates the history of anthracite mining, quotes from the Phoebe Snow campaigns in its final movement.

A song by Catherine Irwin called "Phoebe Snow" was released on the self-titled 2022 album by Freakons, an album of mining-themed songs by members of the Mekons and Freakwater.

== Brandy Alexander cocktail ==
The Brandy Alexander, a cocktail containing cognac, crème de cacao and cream, was said to have been created for a dinner celebrating Phoebe Snow. The bartender at Rector's, Troy Alexander, was looking to create a white drink to mimic Phoebe's white attire.
