= List of Sussex County, New Jersey people =

Sussex County in northwestern New Jersey has had a place in over three centuries of modern history, beginning with the age of European settlement and exploration during the American colonial period. The county and its people have been involved in all aspects of the American experience. As a large area of New Jersey that was included in Sussex County from its founding to 1753 were ceded to create Warren County in 1824, all persons residing in those areas are not listed here.

The following is a list of notable people from Sussex County, New Jersey:

== Public service ==
=== Politicians and civil service ===
- Samuel Fowler (1779-1844), doctor, discoverer of several minerals, iron and zinc mine owner in (Franklin and Ogdensburg), U.S. House of Representatives (1833-1837).
- Samuel Fowler (1851-1919), U.S. House of Representatives (1889-1893).
- Scott Garrett (born 1959), legislator, New Jersey General Assembly, U.S. House of Representatives (2003–2017).
- John W. Griggs (1849-1927), Governor of New Jersey.
- Daniel Haines (1801-1877), Governor of New Jersey.
- Ardolph L. Kline (1858-1930), Congressman and Mayor of New York City.
- John Linn (1763–1821), U.S. House of Representatives.
- Robert Littell (1936-2014), New Jersey State Senator.
- Lewis J. Martin (1844-1913) - Sussex County clerk, legislator, U.S. House of Representatives (1913).
- Alison Littell McHose (born 1965), Member of the New Jersey General Assembly.
- Parker Space (born 1968) Member of the New Jersey General Assembly. (2013-Present)
- Nathaniel Pettit (1724-1803), Canadian politician.
- Rodman M. Price (1816-1894), Governor of New Jersey.
- Andrew J. Rogers (1828–1900), attorney, U.S. House of Representatives (1863-1867), Denver police commissioner.
- John Rutherfurd (1760-1840), United States Senator (1791–1799).
- Casper Shafer (1712-1784), first settler of Stillwater, legislator (1776-1779).
- A. A. Townsend (1811-1879), founder Rough and Ready, California; member of the Wisconsin State Legislature

=== Military service ===
- Thomas Oakley Anderson (1793-1844), United States Navy officer during the First Barbary War (1803–1805).
- Edwin F. Cooke (1835-1867), American Civil War military officer (Brigadier General)
- Aaron Hankinson (1735-1806) American Revolution military officer (Brigadier General), state legislator
- Hugh Judson Kilpatrick (1836-1881) Civil War general, diplomat.
- John Cleves Symmes (1742-1814), Revolutionary War military officer, politician, and settler of Ohio.

== Arts and entertainment ==
=== Visual arts ===
- Gretna Campbell (1922–1987), painter (New York School).
- Louis Finkelstein (1923–2000), painter (New York School), art critic, art professor.
- Reuben Kadish (1913–1992), painter, sculptor and printmaker.

=== Writing ===
- Helena Rutherfurd Ely (1858–1920), author, garden writer.
- Nicolas de Gunzburg (1904-1981), fashion critic, magazine editor (Vogue, Harpers), actor.
- Aline Murray Kilmer (1888–1941), author, poet, wife of poet and critic Joyce Kilmer.
- J. Allyn Rosser (born 1957), poet and academic.

=== Musicians ===
- Rob Freeman (born 1981), musician, who performed with Hidden in Plain View.
- Homer Mensch (1914-2005), classical double bassist who performed with the New York Philharmonic.
- Railroad Earth — musicians
- Al Chez - Trumpet Player on Late Night With David Letterman

=== Acting ===
- William Pierson — actor.
- Janeane Garofalo — comedian, actress, activist.

=== Television personalities ===
- Lou Dobbs — television and radio news commentator (CNN and Fox News).
- John Gibson — television news host on FoxNews.
- Andrew Napolitano — current libertarian Fox News Judicial Analyst, former judge (Superior Court of New Jersey).

== Science, technology and medicine ==
- Charles Joseph Fletcher (1922–2011) — inventor of the Hovercraft, worked on Apollo Lunar Module and X-15 rocket.
- Hudson Maxim (1853–1927) — inventor, chemist, scientist, munitions manufacturer.
- Ross Winans (1796–1877) — inventor, entrepreneur.

== Business ==
- Newman E. Drake (1860–1930) — entrepreneur, founder of Drake's Cakes.

== Athletes and sports figures ==
- Nick Boyle (born 1993), NFL - Baltimore Ravens TE
- Lou Benfatti (born 1971), NFL and college football player.
- Mike Budnik — former professional inline skater, and professional mixed martial arts fighter
- Chris Jent — NBA Player and Coach.
- Danny Kass — Olympic and champion snowboarder
- Dan Miller — UFC Contender, CFFC Middleweight Champion, IFL Middleweight Champion
- Jim Miller — UFC Contender, CFFC Lightweight Champion, Reality Fighting Featherweight Champion
- Troy Murphy — NBA and college basketball player.
- Adam Riggs — Major League Baseball player
- Russ Van Atta — Major League Baseball player (New York Yankees), county sheriff (1941-1944).
- Dave Yovanovits (born 1981), former NFL football player.
- David Zabriskie (born 1986), retired amateur wrestler and current wrestling coach.

== Miscellaneous ==
- Ira Condict (d. 1811) — Presbyterian and Dutch Reformed clergyman, third president of Queen's College (now Rutgers University).
- Zip the Pinhead — circus sideshow personality with P.T. Barnum.

== See also ==
- History of Sussex County, New Jersey
