= Stillwater Township, New Jersey =

Township in Sussex County, New Jersey, US

- Township
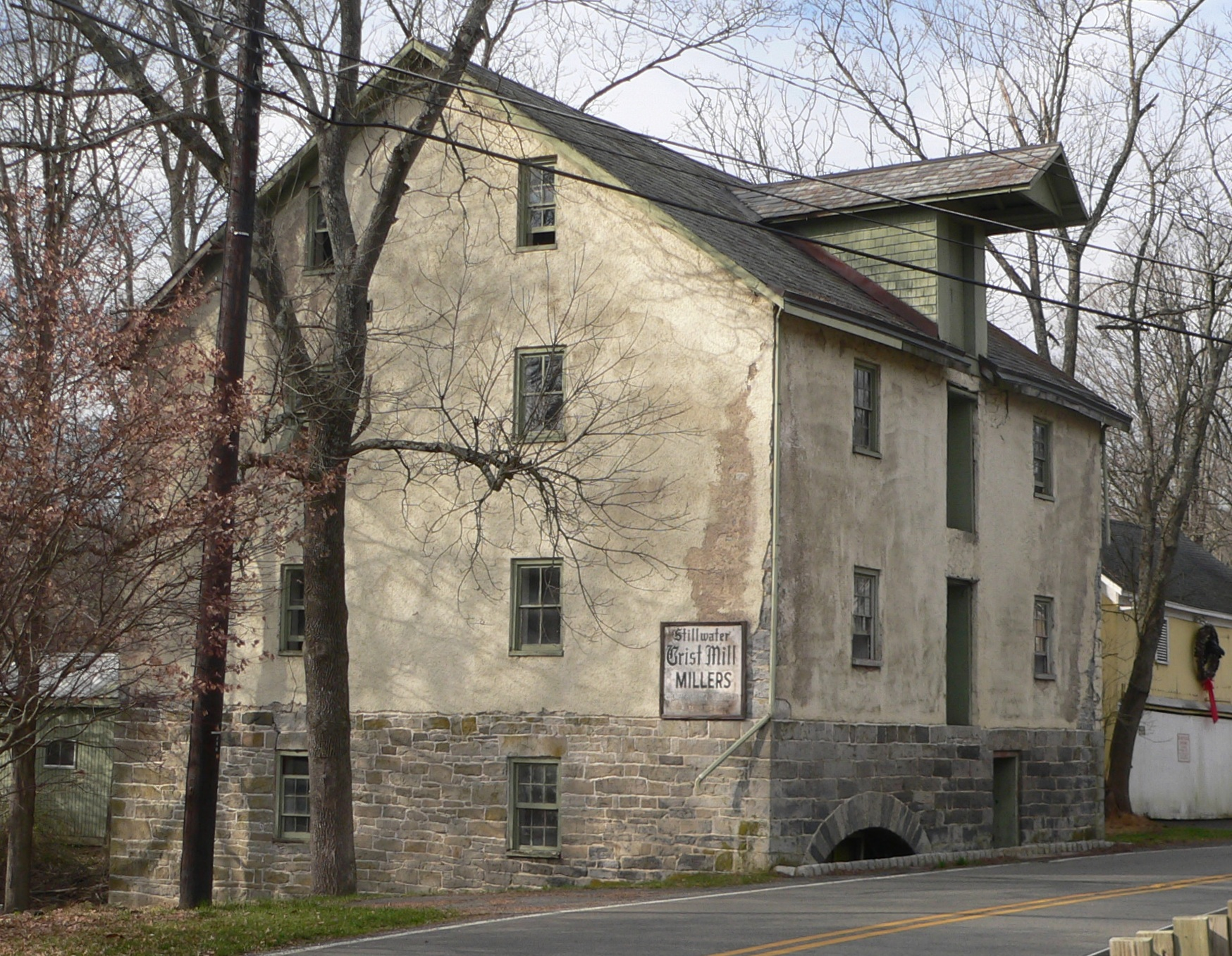
- Casper and Abraham Shafer Grist Mill Complex

- Seal

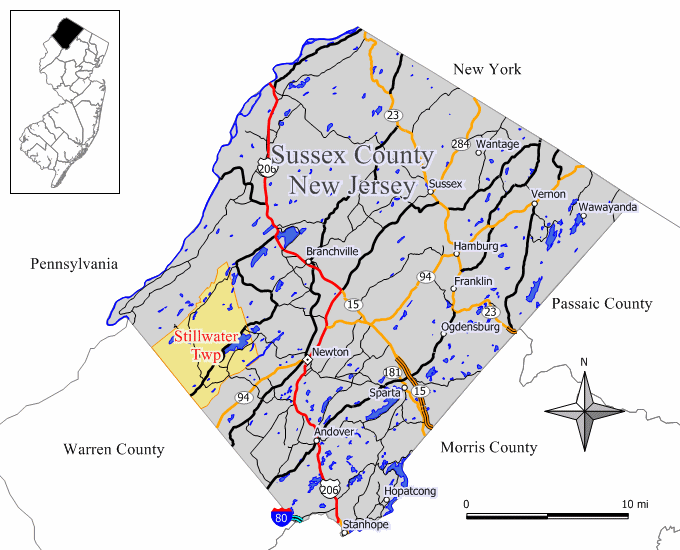
- Location of Stillwater Township in Sussex County highlighted in yellow (right). Inset map: Location of Sussex County in New Jersey highlighted in black (left).

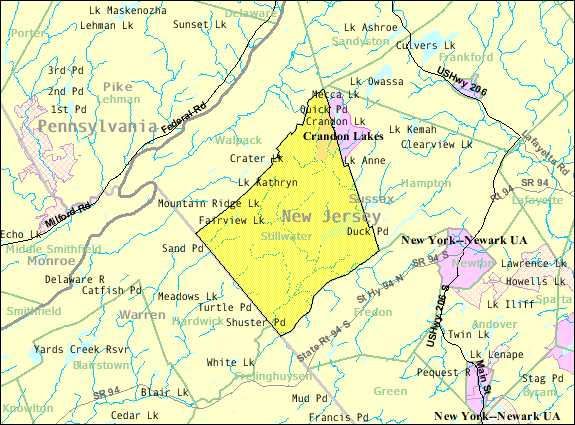
- Census Bureau map of Stillwater Township

- Location in Sussex County Location in New Jersey Location in the United States
- Coordinates: 41.074125°N 74.868878°W
- Country: United States
- State: New Jersey
- County: Sussex
- Incorporated: December 27, 1824

Government
  - Type: Township
  - Body: Township Committee
  - Mayor: Vera Rumsey (R, term ends December 31, 2026)
  - Municipal clerk: Valerie Ingles

Area
  - Total: 28.25 sq mi (73.17 km^{2})
  - Land: 26.92 sq mi (69.73 km^{2})
  - Water: 1.32 sq mi (3.43 km^{2}) 4.69%
  - Rank: 96th of 565 in state 8th of 24 in county
- Elevation: 718 ft (219 m)

Population (2020)
  - Total: 4,004
  - Estimate (2023): 4,063
  - Rank: 413th of 565 in state 12th of 24 in county
  - Density: 148.7/sq mi (57.4/km^{2})
  - Rank: 519th of 565 in state 20th of 24 in county
- Time zone: UTC−05:00 (Eastern (EST))
  - Summer (DST): UTC−04:00 (Eastern (EDT))
- ZIP Code: 07875
- Area code: 973
- FIPS code: 34-70890
- GNIS ID: 882262
- Website: www.stillwatertownshipnj.com

Stillwater Township is a township located in Sussex County, in the U.S. state of New Jersey. Situated in the Kittatinny Valley, Stillwater is a rural farming community with a long history of dairy farming. As of the 2020 United States census, the township's population was 4,004, a decrease of 95 (−2.3%) from the 2010 census count of 4,099, which in turn reflected a decrease of 168 (−3.9%) from the 4,267 counted in the 2000 census.

Stillwater was settled in the eighteenth century by Palatine German immigrants who entered through the port of Philadelphia. In 1741, Casper Shafer, John George Wintermute (Windemuth), and their father-in-law Johan Peter Bernhardt settled along the Paulins Kill. For the next 50 years, the village of Stillwater was essentially German, centered on a union church shared by Lutheran and German Reformed (Calvinist) congregations. The German population assimilated by the early nineteenth century, but evidence of their settlement remains in the architecture of the grist mills, lime kilns, and stone houses located throughout the valley. Stillwater was incorporated as a township by an act of the New Jersey Legislature on December 27, 1824, from portions of Hardwick Township when Sussex County was divided in half by the legislature a few weeks earlier to create Warren County. Portions of the township were taken to form Fredon Township on February 24, 1904.

In 2008, New Jersey Monthly magazine ranked Stillwater Township as its 40th best place to live in its annual rankings of the "Best Places To Live" in New Jersey.

== History ==
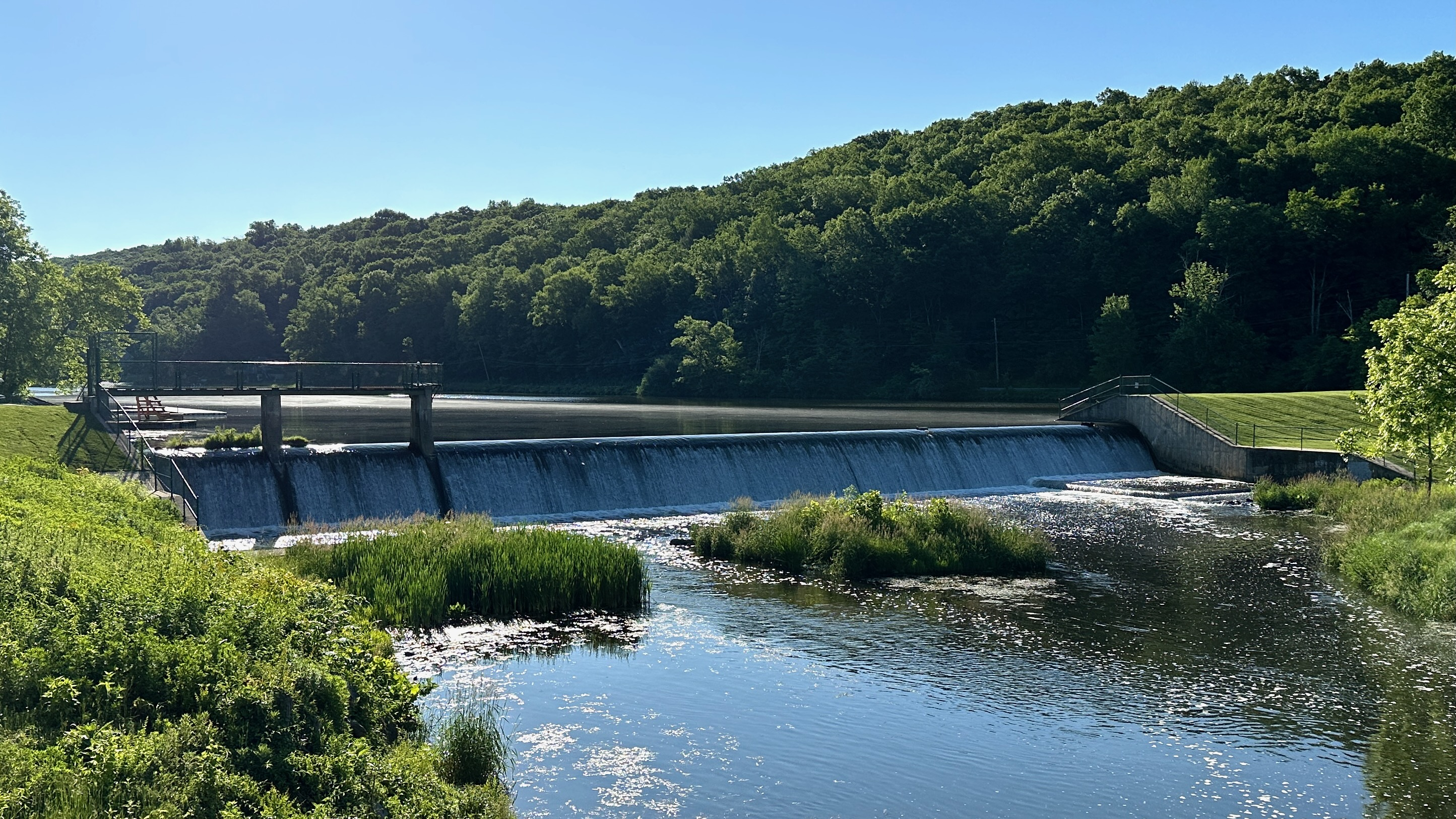
Paulins Kill Lake Dam

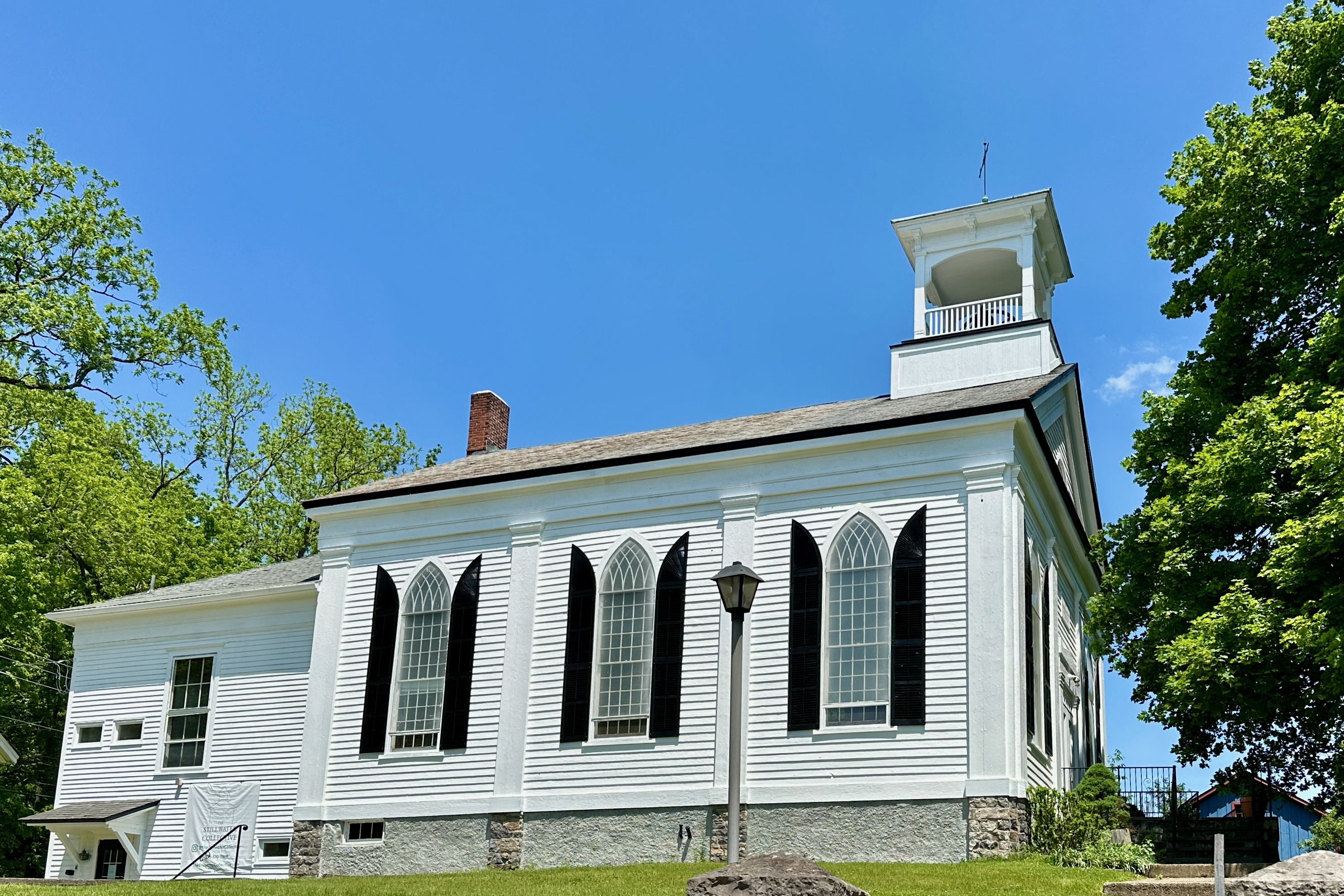
First Presbyterian Church of Stillwater

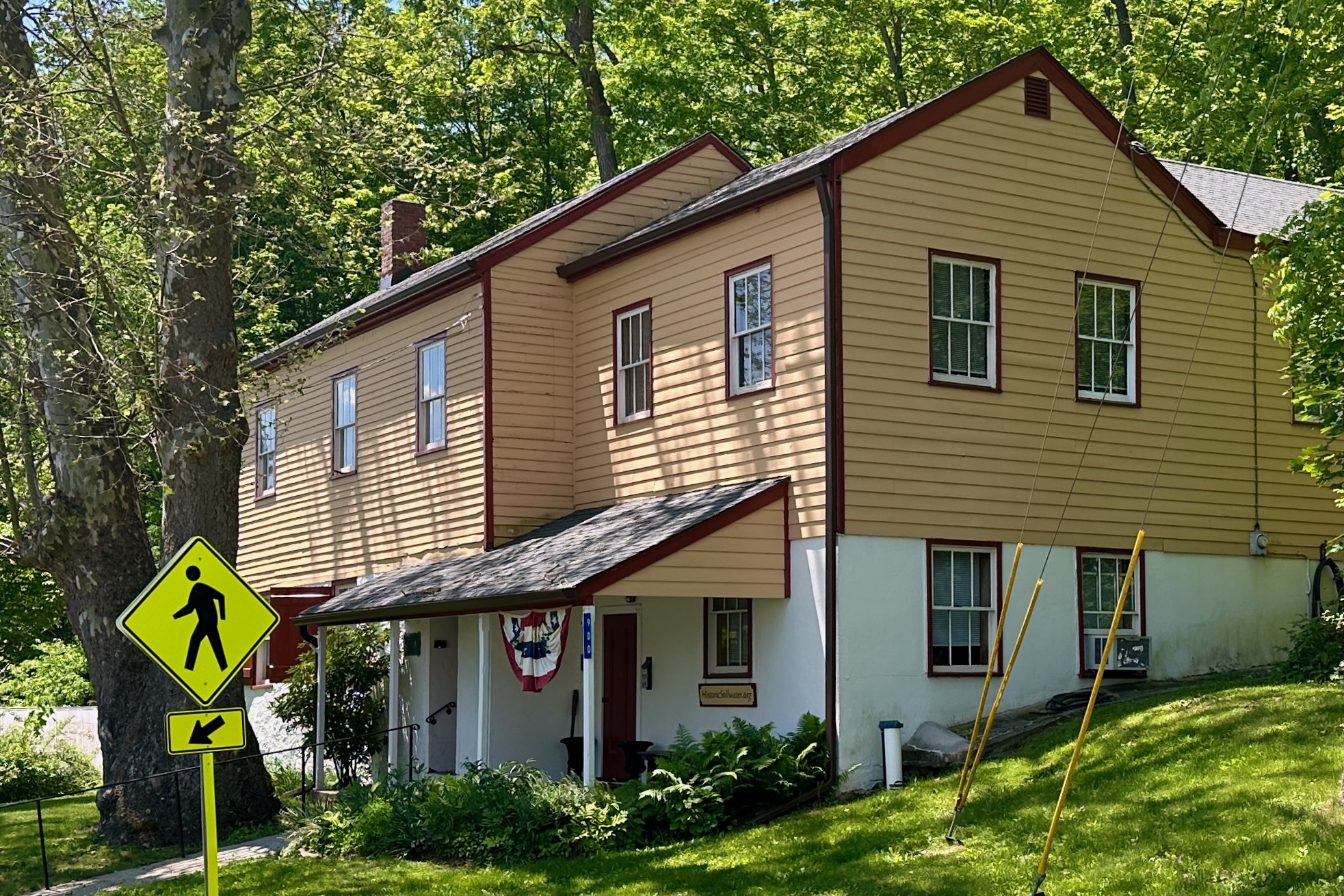
The Academy, home of the Historical Society of Stillwater Township

The township was created on December 27, 1824, by an act passed by the New Jersey Legislature.

A prominent structure in the area's history is the Shafer Grist Mill. Originally built by Casper Shafer in 1741, it was moved approximately a half mile to its present location in 1764. It was rebuilt in 1844 and powered by water from the Paulins Kill. Casper's son, Nathan Armstrong Shafer lived in Whitehall Manor, which he built near what is now the center of the village. The gristmill operated commercially until 1955, making it one of the oldest, continuously operating, water-powered gristmills in the State of New Jersey. Aline Murray Kilmer, the widow of poet Joyce Kilmer, lived the last decade of her life at Whitehall, dying there on October 1, 1941.

In the early 1900s, Swartswood Lake became a major resort. Weekenders took the train into nearby Blairstown through the 1940s to stay at such places as the North Shore Inn, The Casino, and The Dove Island Inn (now a private home). Later, summer cabins became popular with Brooklyn weekenders.

The Stillwater creamery was built in 1910. Borden, Inc. later took control of the creamery.

In the 1920s, the Paulins Kill was dammed to create Paulins Kill Lake and many summer residences sprang up. These summer cottages have grown into what is now a year-round community.

The Presbyterian Church is the most prominent feature in Stillwater village. Opposite the church is the former Academy, an old schoolhouse that is now home of the Historical Society of Stillwater Township. Stillwater was, and still is, primarily agricultural. The area is dotted with lime kilns, which used to burn lime to enrich the soil, but are now obsolete, becoming lost to history and the overgrowth of vegetation. An intact kiln still exists on Millbrook Road, a little more than two miles (3 km) from Stillwater village.

Roughly one-third of Stillwater Township's area was ceded to create Fredon Township in 1904.

== Geography ==
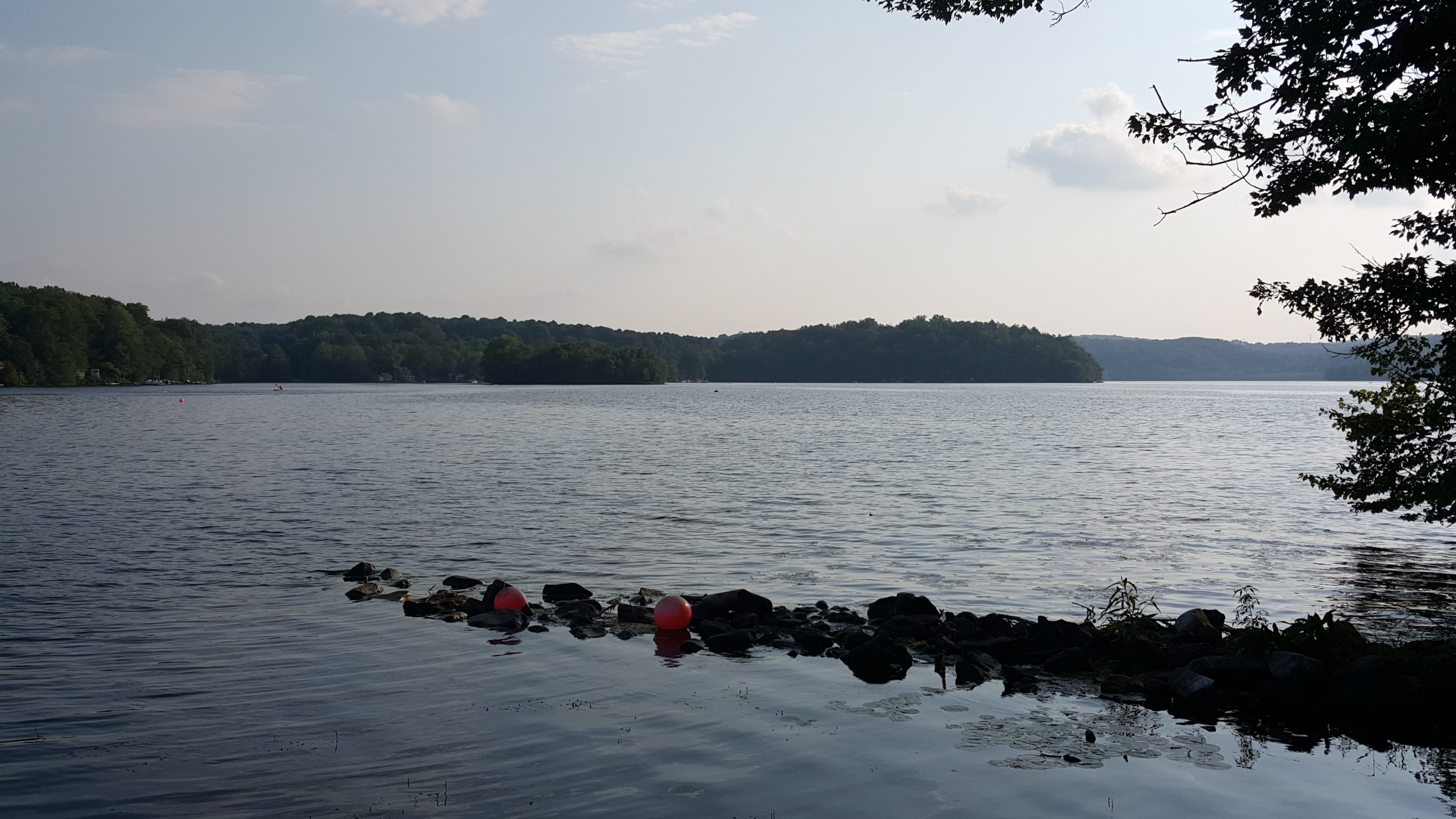
Swartswood Lake is the third-largest freshwater lake in New Jersey

According to the United States Census Bureau, the township had a total area of 28.25 square miles (73.17 km^{2}), including 26.92 square miles (69.73 km^{2}) of land and 1.33 square miles (3.43 km^{2}) of water (4.69%).

The township borders the municipalities of Fredon Township, Hampton Township and Walpack Township in Sussex County; and both Frelinghuysen Township and Hardwick Township in Warren County.

=== Neighborhoods ===
Crandon Lakes (with a 2010 Census population of 496 in Stillwater Township, out of a CDP total of 1,178) is an unincorporated community and census-designated place (CDP) split between Hampton Township and Stillwater Township.

Other unincorporated communities, localities and place names located partially or completely within the township include Catfish Pond, Duck Pond, Fairview Lake, Five Points, Lake Kathryn, Middleville, Mud Pond, Paulins Kill Lake, Quick Pond, Stillwater, Swartswood, Swartswood Lake and Wintermutes Foundry.

Stillwater is a small one-street village in the area that was first settled by Johan Peter Bernhardt and his two sons-in-law, John George Wintermute and Casper Shafer. At the western terminus of end of Main Street where it meets County Route 521, the First Presbyterian Church of Stillwater is the dominant feature. As Main Street travels east, the Garris's General Store (1876), "Whitehall" (built in 1785 by Abraham Shafer), Casper Shafer's stonehouse (c. 1741), crossing the Paulins Kill near Shafer's grist mill (1764, 1844) and miller's house. An 1820 hostelry, the Stillwater Inn, recently was destroyed by fire. One half-mile (800 m) south of the Presbyterian church, is John George Wintermute's stonehouse (1755), his son Peter's stonehouse (1791). Located adjacent is Stillwater Cemetery—the site of the original Lutheran-Calvinist union church (1771–1838), the graves of the towns earliest settlers, and many eighteenth century ethnic German gravestones.

=== Geology ===
Flanked to the west by Kittatinny Mountain, the Stillwater Township is located within the Ridge and Valley Physiographic Province, and the entire township is within the Kittatinny Valley a region of rolling hills and flat valley floors that is a section of the larger Great Appalachian Valley running 700 miles (1,100 km) from eastern Canada to northern Alabama. Elevations in this valley range from 400 to 1,000 feet (120–300 m). According to Snell, "The surface of the country is generally uneven and hilly, and on the west exceedingly rugged and mountainous. Ponds and watercourses abound. Of the latter, the most important is the Paulinskill, a millstream of considerable consequence." All of Stillwater Township is located in the Paulins Kill watershed which flows southwest through Sussex and Warren counties before joining the Delaware River near Columbia, New Jersey. The valley floor is part of the Ordovician Martinsburg Formation (shale and slate) which make up most of the valley—and the Jacksonburg Formation (mostly limestone).

=== Climate ===
Stillwater Township, New Jersey

Climate chart (precipitation, max. and min. temperature)
J	F	M	A	M	J	J	A	S	O	N	D
3.2 36 17	2.9 40 19	3.7 48 27	4 61 37	4.1 71 47	4.8 79 56	4.4 84 61	4.3 83 59	4.5 75 51	4.1 64 39	3.7 53 31	3.4 41 23
- █ Average max. and min. temperatures in °F
- █ Precipitation totals in inches
- Source: The Weather Channel
Metric conversion
J	F	M	A	M	J	J	A	S	O	N	D
81 2 −8	73 4 −7	93 9 −3	102 16 3	105 22 8	121 26 13	113 29 16	109 28 15	114 24 11	103 18 4	93 12 −1	87 5 −5
- █ Average max. and min. temperatures in °C
- █ Precipitation totals in mm

Stillwater Township is located in Northwestern New Jersey which has a humid continental climate (microthermal)—a cooler climate due to its higher elevations.

== Demographics ==
Historical population
Census	Pop.	Note	%±
1830	1,381		—
1840	1,476		6.9%
1850	1,742		18.0%
1860	1,816		4.2%
1870	1,632		−10.1%
1880	1,502		−8.0%
1890	1,296		−13.7%
1900	1,108		−14.5%
1910	796	*	−28.2%
1920	671		−15.7%
1930	706		5.2%
1940	679		−3.8%
1950	816		20.2%
1960	1,339		64.1%
1970	2,158		61.2%
1980	3,887		80.1%
1990	4,253		9.4%
2000	4,267		0.3%
2010	4,099		−3.9%
2020	4,004		−2.3%
2023 (est.)	4,063		1.5%
Population sources: 1830–1920 1840 1850–1870; 1850 1870 1880–1890; 1890–1910 1910–1930; 1940–2000 2000; 2010 * = Lost territory in previous decade.

=== 2010 census ===
The 2010 United States census counted 4,099 people, 1,553 households, and 1,141 families in the township. The population density was 151.5 per square mile (58.5/km^{2}). There were 1,930 housing units at an average density of 71.3 per square mile (27.5/km^{2}). The racial makeup was 97.07% (3,979) White, 0.66% (27) Black or African American, 0.05% (2) Native American, 0.71% (29) Asian, 0.02% (1) Pacific Islander, 0.20% (8) from other races, and 1.29% (53) from two or more races. Hispanic or Latino of any race were 2.20% (90) of the population.

Of the 1,553 households, 30.0% had children under the age of 18; 61.4% were married couples living together; 7.6% had a female householder with no husband present and 26.5% were non-families. Of all households, 21.6% were made up of individuals and 6.1% had someone living alone who was 65 years of age or older. The average household size was 2.64 and the average family size was 3.09.

21.9% of the population were under the age of 18, 8.1% from 18 to 24, 22.0% from 25 to 44, 36.8% from 45 to 64, and 11.2% who were 65 years of age or older. The median age was 43.8 years. For every 100 females, the population had 97.9 males. For every 100 females ages 18 and older there were 100.1 males.

The Census Bureau's 2006–2010 American Community Survey showed that (in 2010 inflation-adjusted dollars) median household income was $79,367 (with a margin of error of +/− $6,830) and the median family income was $94,900 (+/− $17,365). Males had a median income of $50,600 (+/− $10,895) versus $52,587 (+/− $7,700) for females. The per capita income for the borough was $32,147 (+/− $2,398). About 7.0% of families and 7.2% of the population were below the poverty line, including 12.2% of those under age 18 and 6.1% of those age 65 or over.

=== 2000 census ===
As of the 2000 United States census there were 4,267 people, 1,494 households, and 1,154 families residing in the township. The population density was 157.3 inhabitants per square mile (60.7/km^{2}). There were 2,030 housing units at an average density of 74.9 per square mile (28.9/km^{2}). The racial makeup of the township was 97.96% White, 0.16% African American, 0.21% Native American, 0.47% Asian, 0.23% from other races, and 0.96% from two or more races. Hispanic or Latino of any race were 2.09% of the population.

There were 1,494 households, out of which 41.0% had children under the age of 18 living with them, 67.6% were married couples living together, 6.7% had a female householder with no husband present, and 22.7% were non-families. 17.3% of all households were made up of individuals, and 5.8% had someone living alone who was 65 years of age or older. The average household size was 2.85 and the average family size was 3.27.

In the township the population was spread out, with 28.0% under the age of 18, 6.6% from 18 to 24, 30.3% from 25 to 44, 26.6% from 45 to 64, and 8.4% who were 65 years of age or older. The median age was 37 years. For every 100 females, there were 97.4 males. For every 100 females age 18 and over, there were 97.6 males.

The median income for a household in the township was $63,750, and the median income for a family was $71,563. Males had a median income of $48,580 versus $35,505 for females. The per capita income for the township was $24,933. About 1.6% of families and 2.8% of the population were below the poverty line, including 1.1% of those under age 18 and 7.6% of those age 65 or over.

== Government ==
=== Local government ===
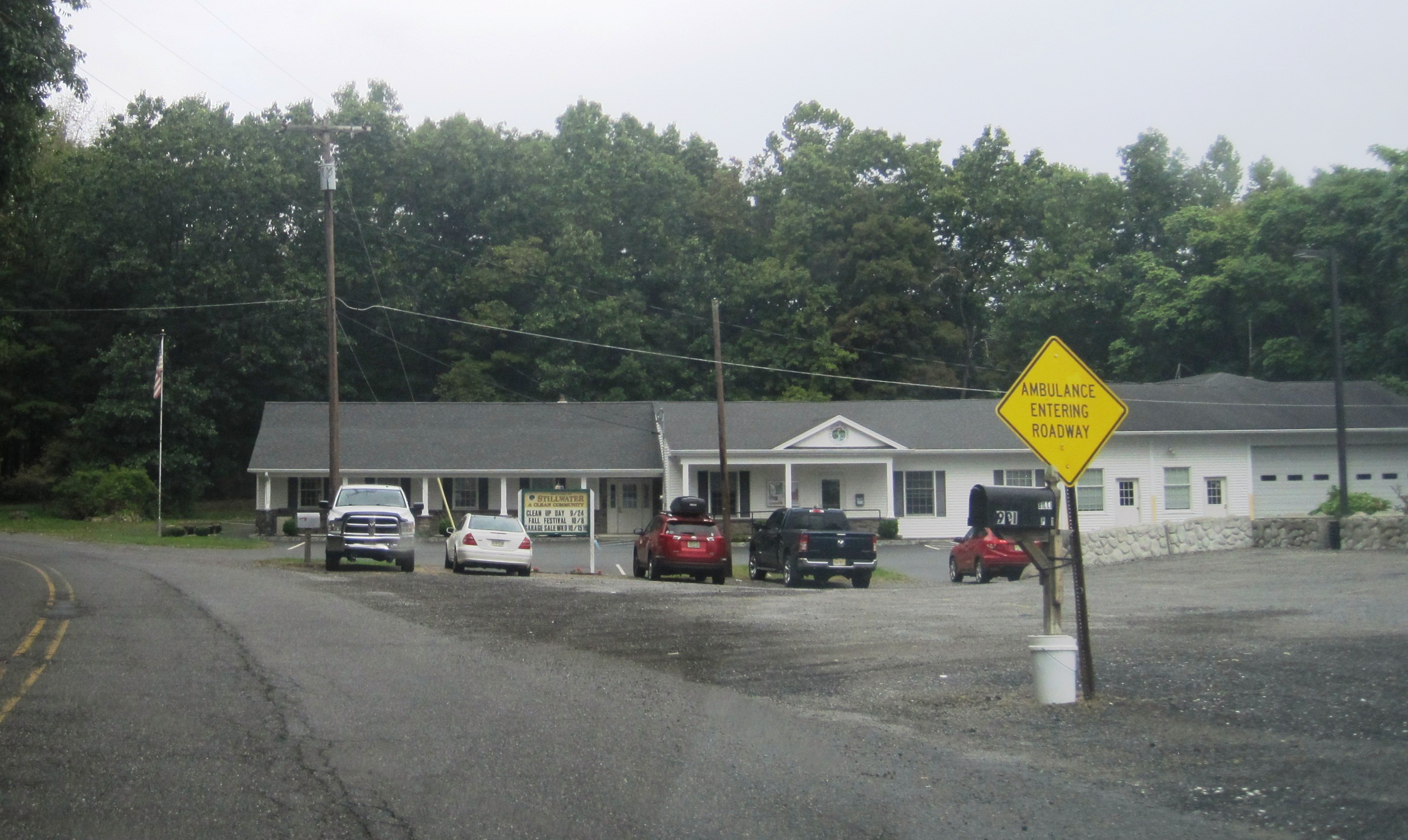
Stillwater Township Municipal Building

Stillwater is governed under the Township form of New Jersey municipal government, one of 141 municipalities (of the 564) statewide that use this form, the second-most commonly used form of government in the state. The Township Committee is comprised of five members, who are elected directly by the voters at-large in partisan elections to serve three-year terms of office on a staggered basis, with either one or two seats coming up for election each year as part of the November general election in a three-year cycle. At an annual reorganization meeting held during the first week of January, the Township Committee selects one of its members to serve as Mayor and another as Deputy Mayor.

As of 2023, members of the Stillwater Township Committee are Mayor Lisa Chammings (R, term on committee and as mayor ends December 31, 2023), Deputy Mayor Vera A. Rumsey (R, term on committee ends 2025; term as deputy mayor ends 2023), Paul Barta (R, 2024), Dawn A. Delaney (R, 2025) and George E. Scott (R, 2024).

==== Local emergency services ====
As of 2010, the Township Committee disbanded the Stillwater Police Department. Pending a lawsuit against the township, the New Jersey State Police assumed police coverage on a full-time basis. The township estimated savings of $482,000 by having State Police coverage; as a rural community, the township would not pay a fee to the State Police.

The Stillwater Area Volunteer Fire Company provide fire and rescue services to the township Stillwater station houses CAFS Pumper 42–62, Rescue-Pumper 42–61, Tanker/Pumper 42–71, Tanker 42–72, Rescue 42–75 and utility and special operations 42–81.

In February 2016, the township disbanded the Swartswood Volunteer Fire Department and reclaimed township-owned vehicles and other property.

In 2020 The Stillwater Emergency Rescue Squad combined with the Stillwater Area Volunteer Fire Department. The Fire department took ownership of both ambulances, personnel and equipment. The Fire Department now provides emergency medical services to the township, utilizing two full-size ambulances.

=== Federal, state, and county representation ===
Stillwater Township is located in the 7th Congressional District and is part of New Jersey's 24th state legislative district.

For the 119th United States Congress, New Jersey's 7th congressional district is represented by Thomas Kean Jr. (R, Westfield). New Jersey is represented in the United States Senate by Democrats Cory Booker (Newark, term ends 2027) and Andy Kim (Moorestown, term ends 2031).

For the 2026–2027 session, the 24th legislative district of the New Jersey Legislature is represented in the State Senate by Parker Space (R, Wantage Township) and in the General Assembly by Dawn Fantasia (R, Franklin) and Mike Inganamort (R, Chester Township).

Sussex County is governed by a Board of County Commissioners whose five members are elected at-large in partisan elections on a staggered basis, with either one or two seats coming up for election each year. At an annual reorganization meeting held in the beginning of January, the board selects a Commissioner Director and Deputy Director from among its members, with day-to-day supervision of the operation of the county delegated to a County Administrator. As of 2025, Sussex County's Commissioners are Director Jill Space (R, Wantage Township, 2025), Deputy Director Chris Carney (R, Frankford Township, 2027), Jack DeGroot (R, Sussex, 2026), William Hayden (I, Branchville, 2025) and Alan Henderson (R, Lafayette Township, 2027).

Constitutional officers elected on a countywide basis are Clerk Jeffrey M. Parrott (R, Wantage Township, 2026), Sheriff Michael F. Strada (R, Hampton Township, 2025) and Surrogate Gary R. Chiusano (R, Frankford Township, 2028).

=== Politics ===
As of March 2011, there were a total of 3,009 registered voters in Stillwater Township, of which 468 (15.6% vs. 16.5% countywide) were registered as Democrats, 1,384 (46.0% vs. 39.3%) were registered as Republicans and 1,153 (38.3% vs. 44.1%) were registered as Unaffiliated. There were 4 voters registered as Libertarians or Greens. Among the township's 2010 Census population, 73.4% (vs. 65.8% in Sussex County) were registered to vote, including 94.0% of those ages 18 and over (vs. 86.5% countywide).

Gubernatorial election results for Stillwater Township
Year	Republican		Democratic		Third party(ies)	
Year	No.	%	No.	%	No.	%
2025	1,243	61.32%	769	37.94%	15	0.74%
2021	1,153	67.07%	547	31.82%	19	1.11%
2017	815	59.40%	471	34.33%	86	6.27%
2013	844	71.46%	294	24.89%	43	3.64%
2009	1,036	63.83%	406	25.02%	181	11.15%
2005	934	62.94%	470	31.67%	80	5.39%

In the 2012 presidential election, Republican Mitt Romney received 1,283 votes (61.9% vs. 59.4% countywide), ahead of Democrat Barack Obama with 735 votes (35.5% vs. 38.2%) and other candidates with 49 votes (2.4% vs. 2.1%), among the 2,073 ballots cast by the township's 3,079 registered voters, for a turnout of 67.3% (vs. 68.3% in Sussex County). In the 2008 presidential election, Republican John McCain received 1,389 votes (59.7% vs. 59.2% countywide), ahead of Democrat Barack Obama with 872 votes (37.5% vs. 38.7%) and other candidates with 52 votes (2.2% vs. 1.5%), among the 2,328 ballots cast by the township's 2,978 registered voters, for a turnout of 78.2% (vs. 76.9% in Sussex County). In the 2004 presidential election, Republican George W. Bush received 1,473 votes (65.0% vs. 63.9% countywide), ahead of Democrat John Kerry with 754 votes (33.3% vs. 34.4%) and other candidates with 35 votes (1.5% vs. 1.3%), among the 2,267 ballots cast by the township's 2,832 registered voters, for a turnout of 80.0% (vs. 77.7% in the whole county).

United States presidential election results for Stillwater Township 2024 2020 2016 2012 2008 2004
Year	Republican		Democratic		Third party(ies)	
Year	No.	%	No.	%	No.	%
2024	1,609	62.88%	914	35.72%	36	1.41%
2020	1,572	59.64%	1,003	38.05%	61	2.31%
2016	1,464	64.44%	682	30.02%	126	5.55%
2012	1,283	62.07%	735	35.56%	49	2.37%
2008	1,389	60.05%	872	37.70%	52	2.25%
2004	1,473	65.12%	754	33.33%	35	1.55%

In the 2013 gubernatorial election, Republican Chris Christie received 71.5% of the vote (844 cast), ahead of Democrat Barbara Buono with 24.9% (294 votes), and other candidates with 3.6% (43 votes), among the 1,193 ballots cast by the township's 3,075 registered voters (12 ballots were spoiled), for a turnout of 38.8%. In the 2009 gubernatorial election, Republican Chris Christie received 1,036 votes (63.3% vs. 63.3% countywide), ahead of Democrat Jon Corzine with 406 votes (24.8% vs. 25.7%), Independent Chris Daggett with 157 votes (9.6% vs. 9.1%) and other candidates with 24 votes (1.5% vs. 1.3%), among the 1,637 ballots cast by the township's 2,991 registered voters, yielding a 54.7% turnout (vs. 52.3% in the county).

United States Senate election results for Stillwater Township1
Year	Republican		Democratic		Third party(ies)	
Year	No.	%	No.	%	No.	%
2024	1,562	62.71%	842	33.80%	87	3.49%
2018	1,135	60.92%	625	33.55%	103	5.53%
2012	1,205	59.45%	721	35.57%	101	4.98%
2006	945	62.75%	460	30.54%	101	6.71%

United States Senate election results for Stillwater Township2
Year	Republican		Democratic		Third party(ies)	
Year	No.	%	No.	%	No.	%
2020	1,536	59.12%	998	38.41%	64	2.46%
2014	686	62.71%	369	33.73%	39	3.56%
2013	544	67.83%	245	30.55%	13	1.62%
2008	1,356	59.95%	789	34.88%	117	5.17%

== Education ==
The Stillwater Township School District serves public school students in pre-kindergarten through sixth grade at Stillwater Township School. As of the 2018–19 school year, the district, comprised of one school, had an enrollment of 254 students and 29.3 classroom teachers (on an FTE basis), for a student–teacher ratio of 8.7:1.

Students in seventh through twelfth grade for public school attend Kittatinny Regional High School located in Hampton Township, which serves students who reside in Fredon Township, Hampton Township, Sandyston Township and Walpack Township. The high school is located on a 96-acre (39 ha) campus in Hampton Township, about seven minutes outside of the county seat of Newton. As of the 2018–19 school year, the high school had an enrollment of 941 students and 97.5 classroom teachers (on an FTE basis), for a student–teacher ratio of 9.7:1. Kittatinny Regional High School was recognized as a National Blue Ribbon School of Excellence in 1997–1998.

== Transportation ==
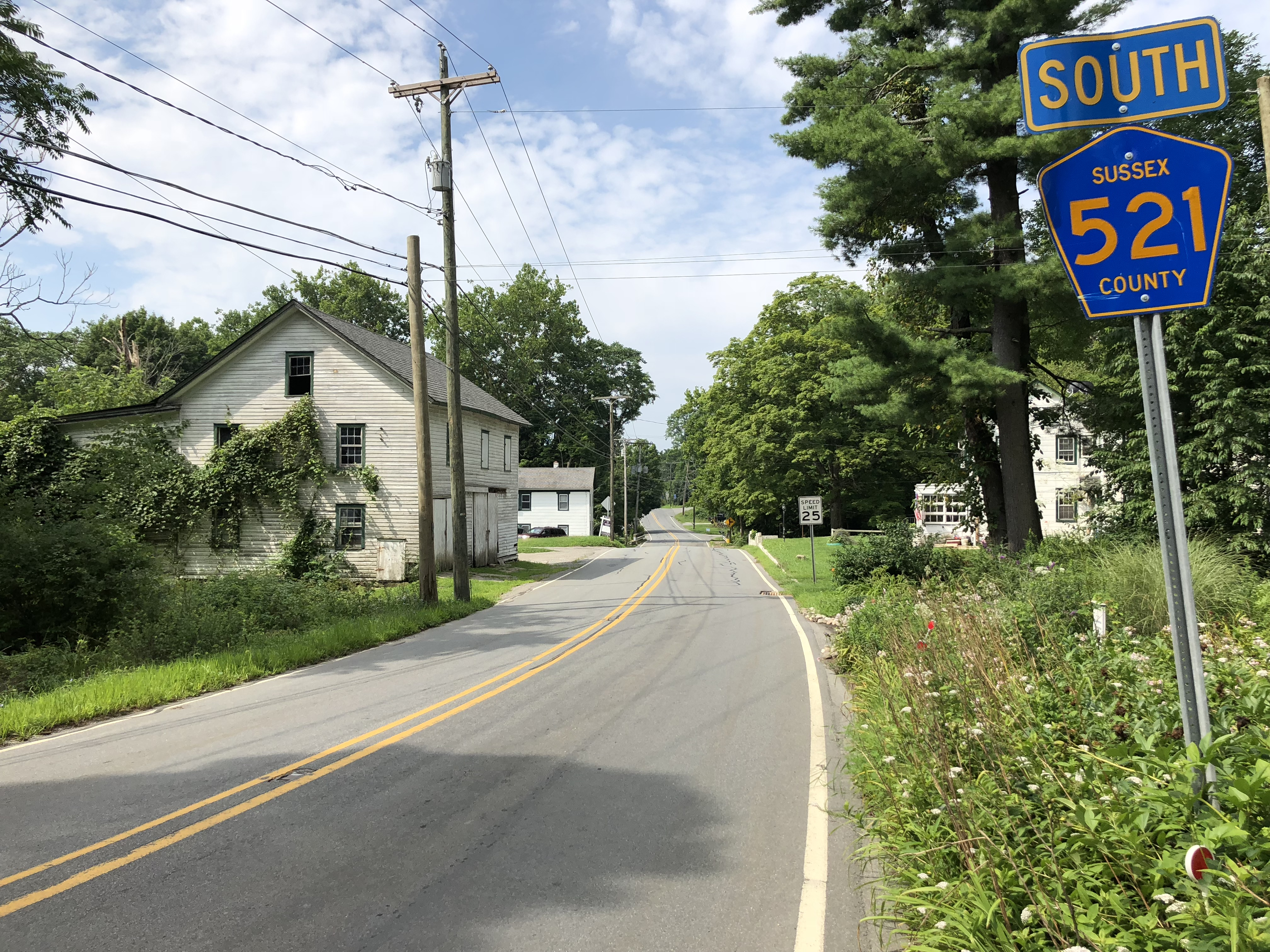
View south along County Route 521 in Stillwater Township

As of May 2010, the township had a total of 60.77 miles (97.80 km) of roadways, of which 39.87 miles (64.16 km) were maintained by the municipality and 20.90 miles (33.64 km) by Sussex County.

No Interstate, U.S. or state highways cross Stillwater Township. The most significant roadway within the township is County Route 521.

== Local attractions ==
=== Parks and recreation ===
Stillwater is the home of Swartswood State Park, established in 1914 as the first state park established by the state of New Jersey. In the center of the park lies the Little Swartswood and Swartswood Lake. The park is operated and maintained by the New Jersey Division of Parks and Forestry.

== Notable people ==
People who were born in, residents of, or otherwise closely associated with Stillwater Township include:

- Rev. Elbert Nevius Condit (1846–1900), son of Rev. T.B. Condit (1804–1888), Presbyterian minister, third president of Occidental College
- Louis Finkelstein (1923–2000), painter, art critic and Queens College professor
- Gretna Campbell Finkelstein (1922–1987), artist affiliated with the New York School, wife of Louis Finkelstein
- Aaron Hankinson (1735–1806), Revolutionary War brigadier general (Sussex County Militia), New Jersey state assemblyman
- Aline Murray Kilmer (1888–1941), poet and author, widow of Joyce Kilmer (1886–1918)
- Casper Shafer (c. 1711–1784), first settler, colonial politician
- Matt Valenti (born 1984), two-time NCAA Division I national champion wrestler from the University of Pennsylvania

== See also ==
- Harmony Hill United Methodist Church
- Paulins Kill
- Stillwater Cemetery
- Stillwater Presbyterian Church
