= Elbert Nevius Condit =

American Presbyterian minister and college president

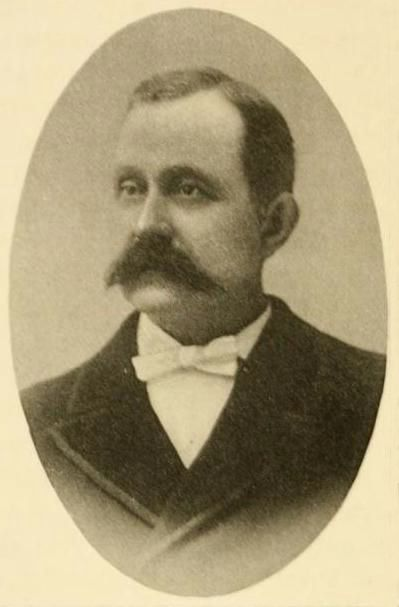
Portrait of Elbert Nevius Condit

The Reverend Elbert Nevius Condit (1846–1900) was a Presbyterian minister and the third president of Occidental College in California.

== Early years ==
Born in Stillwater, New Jersey, Elbert Nevius Condit was the son of the Reverend Thaniel Beers (T.B.) Condit (1804–1888) and Rebecca Jane Shafer (1814–1889). Elbert was named for the Reverend Elbert Nevius (1808–1897), a Presbyterian minister who served as a missionary with the Missionaries of the American Board to China. Rev. Nevius married T.B. Condit's sister, Maria (1808–1886).

== Ministry and career ==
Condit earned his bachelor's degree from The College of New Jersey (now Princeton University) in 1873 and attended the Princeton Theological Seminary where he prepared for the ministry in the Presbyterian church. Condit graduated the seminary in 1877, and on 9 May 1877 was ordained at the First Presbyterian Church of Stillwater in Stillwater—the congregation his father served for 44 years. Condit went to the Pacific Northwest with his younger brother, Rev. Isaac Hiram Condit (1848-1930), to serve as a home missionary in Astoria and Clatsop Plains, Oregon. In 1879, he was appointed president of the Albany Collegiate Institute (now Lewis & Clark College) in Albany, Oregon.

Condit was appointed as the third president of Occidental College near Los Angeles, California and served in the post from 1894 to 1896. He resigned to take up the pastorate of the Presbyterian congregation in Walla Walla, Washington.

== Works ==
- 1888: Historical Sketch of the Presbytery of Oregon
