= Nancy Friese =

American visual artist, educator (born 1948)

Nancy Marlene Friese
- Born: 1948 (age 77–78); Fargo, North Dakota, U.S.
- Education: University of North Dakota (BS), Yale University (MFA)
- Occupations: Visual artist, printmaker, educator
- Known for: Plein air painting and prints, watercolorist
- Website: www.nancyfriese.com

Nancy Marlene Friese (born 1948) is an American painter, printmaker, and educator. She is known for landscape paintings, and prints which are often colorful. Friese is a professor at Rhode Island School of Design, and an elected National Academician in the National Academy of Design in New York City. She has exhibited both nationally and internationally in 30 solo, and 170 group shows.

== Early life and education ==
She was born in 1948, in Fargo, North Dakota, and was raised in Ohio. Her great-grandparents had a homestead in Buxton, North Dakota.

She holds a BS degree (1970) in nursing from University of North Dakota, and an MFA degree (1980) in painting and printmaking from Yale University, in New Haven, Connecticut. Friese also studied in the graduate painting program at the University of California, Berkeley, and studied both printmaking and painting at the Art Academy of Cincinnati in the late 1970s.

== Career ==
Friese has consistently worked as a plein air artist for much of her career.

"A sense of the local is central to Nancy Friese’s work, which documents places and events that are specific and personal, while offering them up to be shared by the viewer. Friese is a landscape artist, and, though she lives and works most of the year in Rhode Island, she spends several weeks each summer in rural Buxton, North Dakota, on the land her great-grandfather homesteaded when he emigrated from Norway."

She captures images in watercolor and oil or acrylic paints, with prints created through woodcuts, etchings, drypoints and monotypes, and ties visual observations to experience. The Boston Globe writes about Friese's Long Summer Light as presenting "the bounty of an old tree's vast summer boughs as they stretch over a honeyed field".

A faculty member at Rhode Island School of Design (RISD) since 1990, Friese has "served as a board member for the College Art Association, the RISD Museum, North Dakota Museum of Art Foundation, FirstWorks Providence, and Buxton in Bloom North Dakota, and she has been a repeat juror with the National Endowment for the Arts, and Japan US Friendship Commission in Washington, D.C.".

In 1990, she was one of three American artists selected as 'Artists at Giverny' to live and paint at Claude Monet's estate in Giverny in Normandy, France, funded by the Reader's Digest.

== Collections ==
Friese's work is held in numerous public collections, including the Boston Public Library; the Florence Griswold Museum, in Connecticut; Hammer Museum at the University of California, Los Angeles; the National Museum of Women in the Arts, in Washington, D.C.; Muscarelle Museum of Art, in Virginia; Museum of Fine Arts Boston; the New York Public Library; the North Dakota Museum of Art; the RISD Museum in Rhode Island; and the Yale University Art Gallery, in Connecticut, among many others.

== Exhibitions ==
=== Solo and two-person exhibitions ===
- 1987, MacKenzie Gallery, College of Wooster, Wooster, Ohio
- 1990, Nancy Friese: New Work, North Dakota Museum of Art, Grand Forks, North Dakota
- 1990, Landscapes by Nancy Friese, University Center Gallery, University of Montana, Missoula, Montana
- 1992, Paintings and Prints, Cornell University Hartell Gallery, Ithaca, New York
- 1994, Japanese Impressions: Prints by Nancy Friese and Keiji Shinohara, Bannister Gallery, Rhode Island College, Providence, Rhode Island
- 1999, Nancy Friese and Henry Finkelstein, Simon Gallery, Morristown, New Jersey
- 2001, Nancy Friese: Watercolors, Pepper Gallery, Boston, Massachusetts
- 2002, Re-Imaging New York, North Dakota Museum of Art, Grand Forks, North Dakota
- 2007, Nancy Friese: From Nature, Alva Gallery, New London, Connecticut
- 2011, Translating Nature: Prints by Nancy Friese, Art Academy of Cincinnati, Ohio
- 2016, Encircling Trees and Radiant Skies, (traveling exhibition), Newport Art Museum in Newport, Rhode Island; North Dakota Museum of Art in Grand Forks, North Dakota; Alexandre Hogue Gallery at University of Tulsa in Tulsa, Oklahoma
- 2022, Eloquent Landscapes: 1982–2022, Cade Tompkins Projects, Providence, Rhode Island

=== Group exhibitions ===
- 1990, Moving the Margins I, Emily Davis Gallery, Akron, Ohio
- 1998, Six Painters, David Winton Bell Gallery, Brown University, Providence, Rhode Island; members of the Rhode Island Chapter of the National Museum of Women
- 2009, Simmons Collects: Celebrating Woman Artists, Trustman Gallery, Simmons College (now Simmons University), Boston, Massachusetts
- 2011, 1st National Exhibition of Intaglio Prints: The National Arts Club, The National Arts Club, New York City, New York; curated by Roberta Waddell
- 2012, The Annual 2012, National Academy Museum, New York City, New York
- 2015, 189th Annual Exhibition, National Academy Museum, New York City, New York
- 2020, Master Drawings New York, New York City, New York
- 2021–2022, On the Basis of Art: 150 Years of Women at Yale, Yale University Art Gallery, New Haven, Connecticut
- 2024, 191st Annual: Academy Style, National Academy of Design, New York City, New York
