= First Reformed Church of New Brunswick =

Historic church in New Jersey, United States

- First Reformed Church
- U.S. National Register of Historic Places
- New Jersey Register of Historic Places
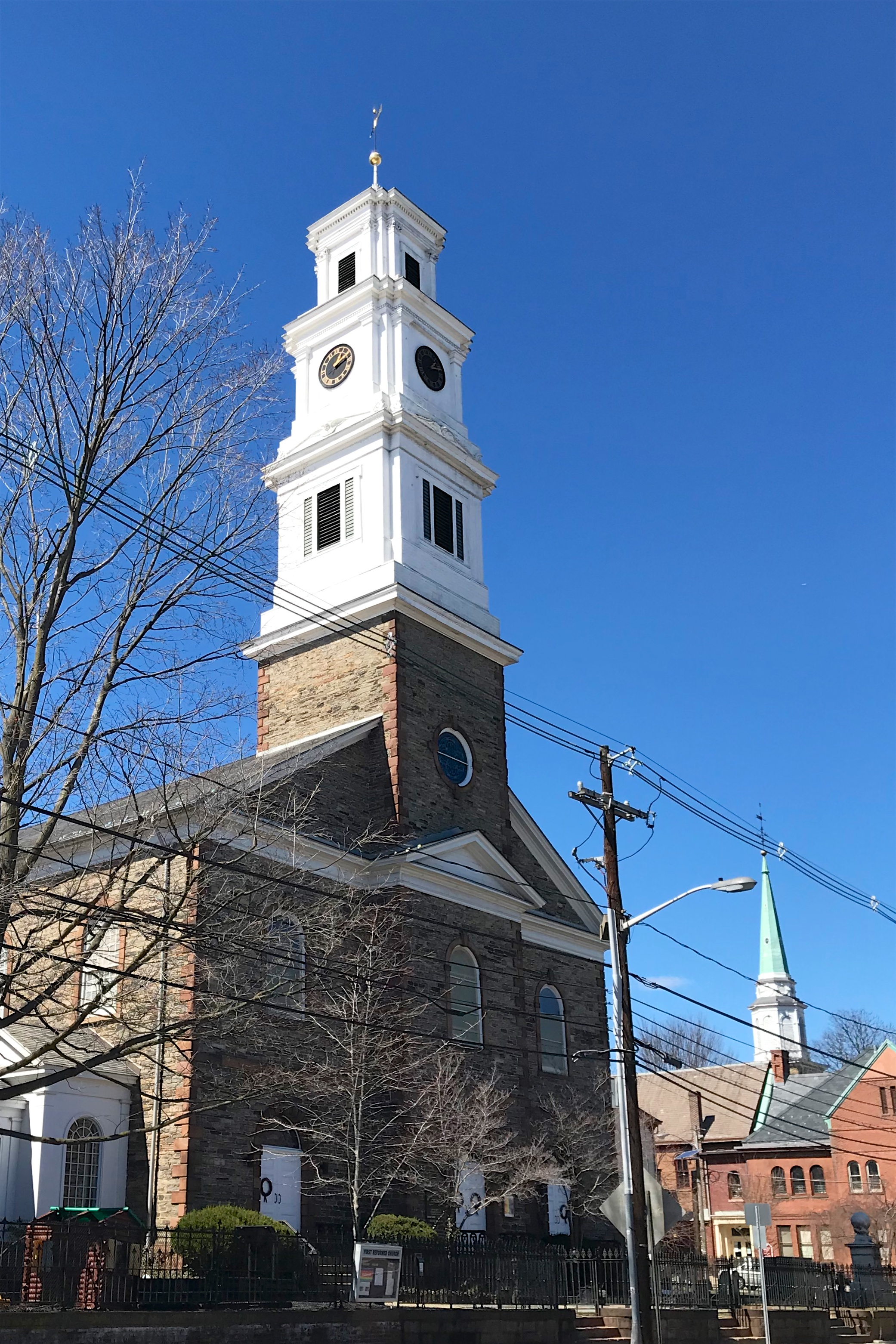
- First Reformed Church, 2018

- Location within Middlesex County, New Jersey Location within New Jersey Location within the United States
- Location: 160 Neilson Street, New Brunswick, New Jersey
- Coordinates: 40°29′42″N 74°26′32″W
- Built: 1812
- Architectural style: Italianate, Georgian, Federal
- NRHP reference No.: 88001703
- NJRHP No.: 1862

Significant dates
- Added to NRHP: September 27, 1988
- Designated NJRHP: August 15, 1988

The First Reformed Church, historically known as the Dutch Reformed Church, is located in New Brunswick, New Jersey on 160 Neilson Street. It is adjacent to the First Reformed Church Cemetery in the churchyard. The education building is located next to the sanctuary building with the street address being 9 Bayard Street. The church building was documented by the Historic American Buildings Survey (HABS) in 1960. It was added to the National Register of Historic Places on September 27, 1988, for its significance in architecture and religion.

== History ==
The congregation was formed in 1717. The church building was constructed in 1812 and features Georgian and Federal architecture. The steeple was added in 1835. By 1867, three new churches had been formed by members of the church: Spotswood (1820), Middlebush Reformed Church (1834), and Second Reformed Church of New Brunswick (1843). In 1971 the church was set on fire.

First Reformed Church Cemetery
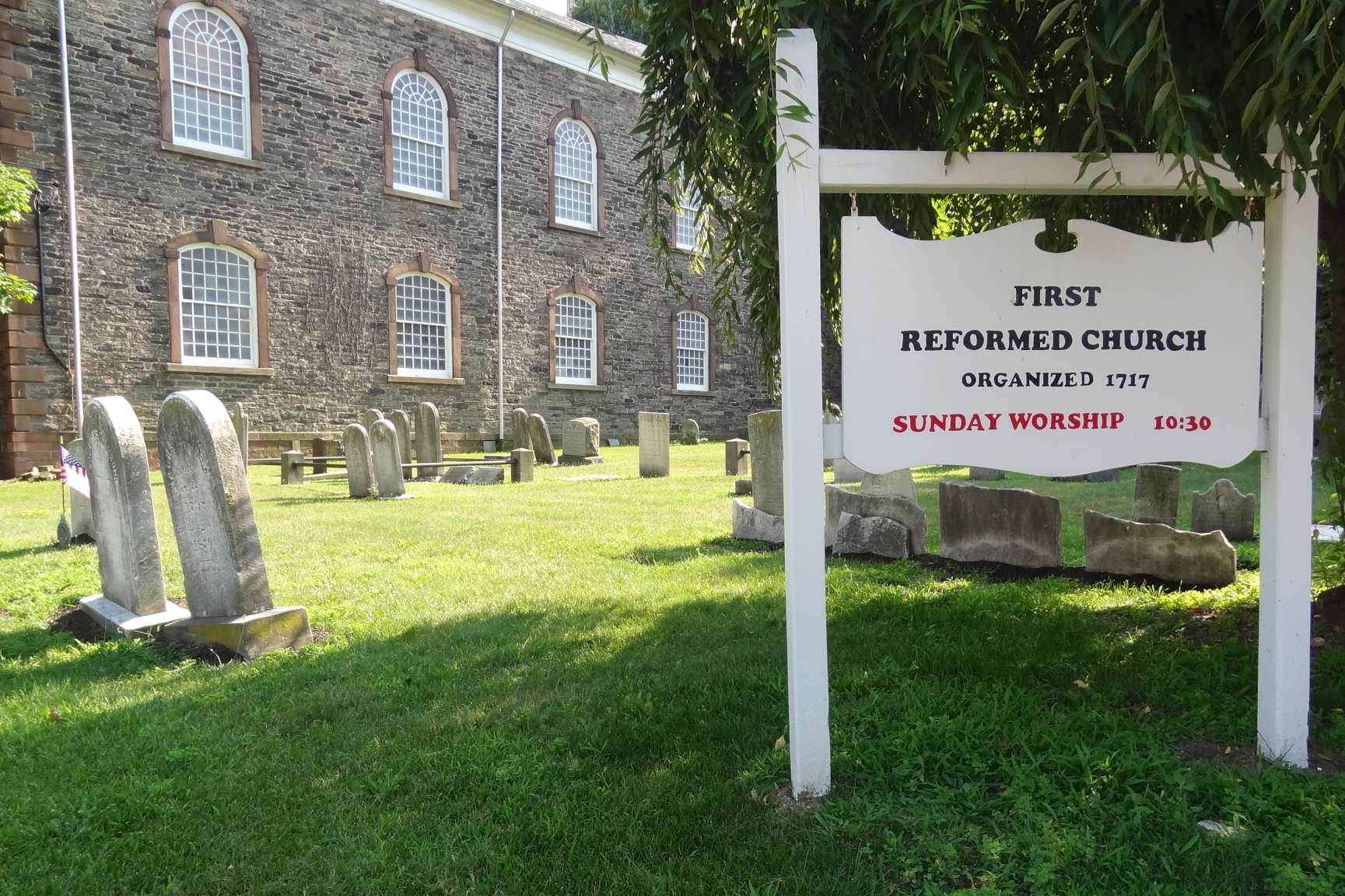
- Interactive map of First Reformed Church Cemetery

Details
- Location: Churchyard

== Notable burials ==
- Jacob Rutsen Hardenbergh, first President of Queen's College (now Rutgers University)
- Ira Condict, third President of Queen's College (now Rutgers University)
- Theodore Frelinghuysen, United States Senator from New Jersey, seventh President of Queen's College (now Rutgers University)

== Gallery ==
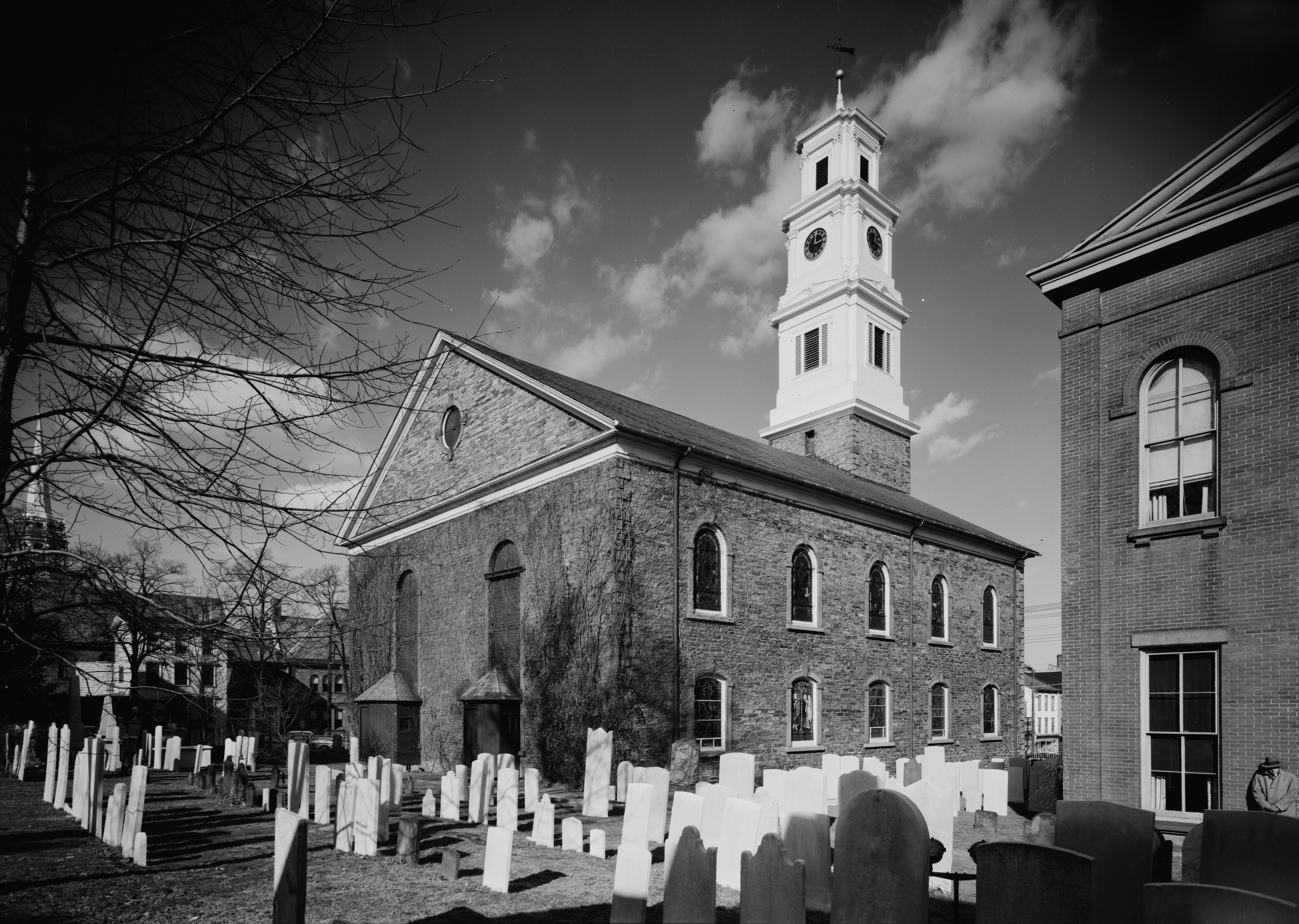
HABS photo of church and cemetery from 1960.

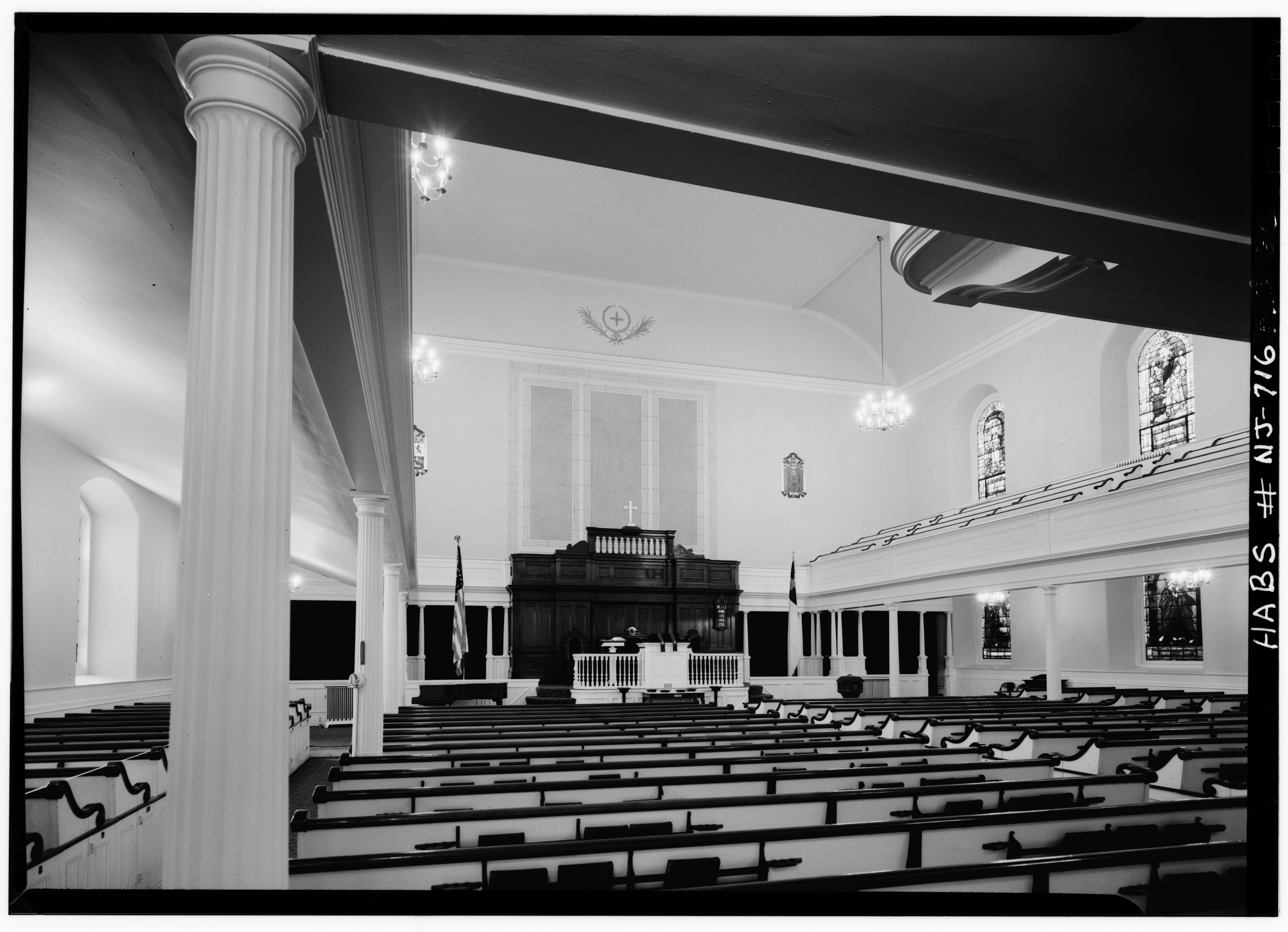
The church interior, March 1960.

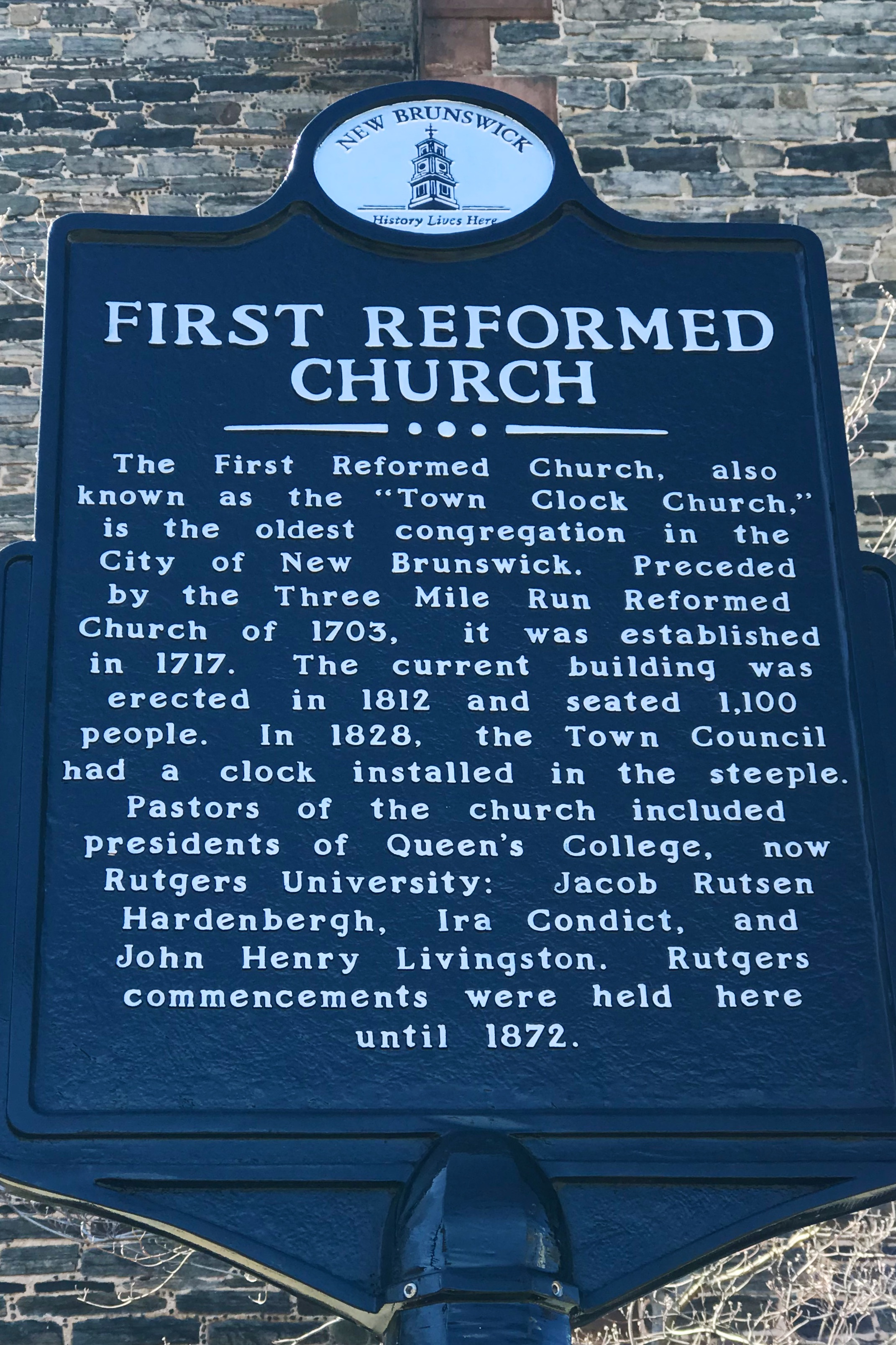
New Brunswick historical information

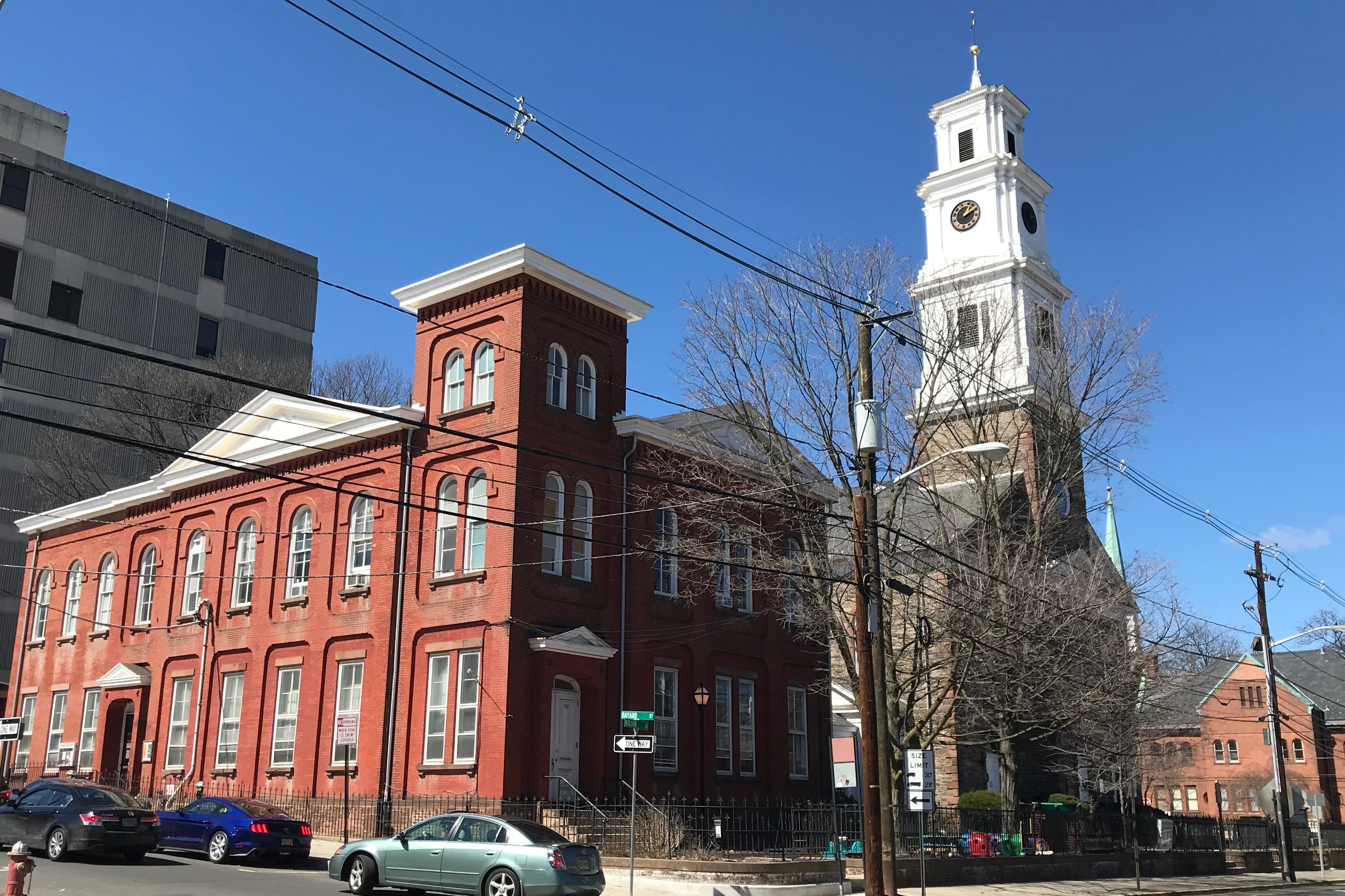
March 2018

== See also ==
- National Register of Historic Places listings in Middlesex County, New Jersey
