= Ira Condict =

American educator and Presbyterian minister (1764–1811)

The Reverend Ira Condict
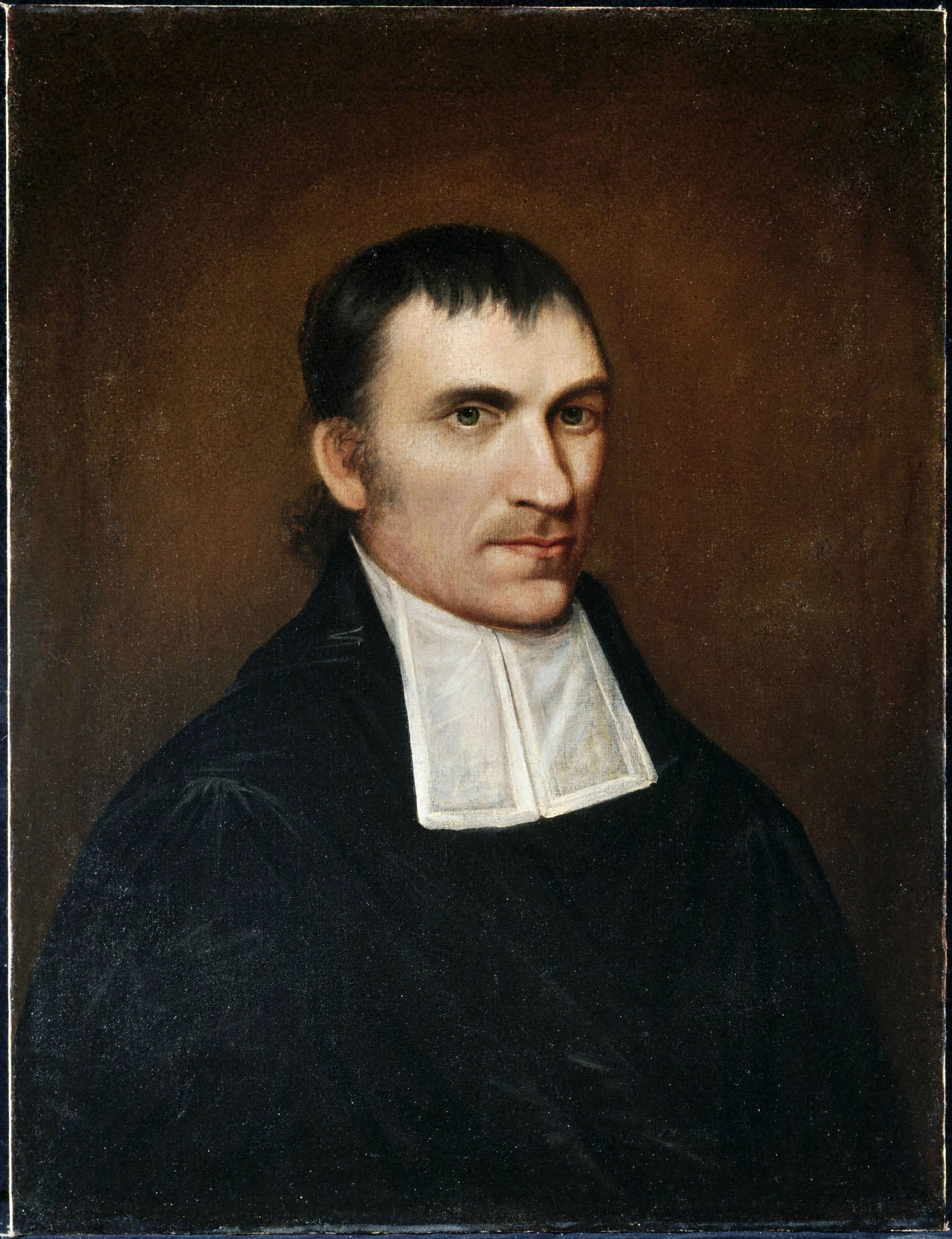
- Portrait, c. 1800

3rd President of Rutgers University
- In office September 30, 1795 – April 1810
- Preceded by: William Linn
- Succeeded by: John Henry Livingston

Personal details
- Born: February 21, 1764 Orange, New Jersey
- Died: July 1, 1811 (aged 47) New Brunswick, New Jersey, US
- Education: Princeton (A.B., 1784)
- Profession: Clergyman, professor

Ira Condict (February 21, 1764 – June 1, 1811) was an American Presbyterian and Dutch Reformed minister who served as the third president of Queen's College (now Rutgers University) in New Brunswick, New Jersey.

A 1784 graduate of the College of New Jersey (now Princeton University), Condict was ordained as a minister in the Presbyterian faith. In 1794, Condict was appointed as Professor of Moral Philosophy at Queen's College in New Brunswick, and subsequently asked to serve as its third president following the resignation of William Linn. Because the college had closed in 1795, Condict served in a pro tempore capacity from 1795 to 1810, dedicating his efforts to providing theological instruction and administering the Queen's College Grammar School (now Rutgers Preparatory School) which remained open during this time. After a difficult fundraising effort led by Condict, Queen's College was reopened in 1807 and he presided over the laying of the cornerstone for the college's Old Queens building on April 27, 1809.

== Biography ==
Condict was born in Orange, New Jersey in 1764 to Daniel Condict (or Condit) and Ruth Harrison. Condict's famous Revolutionary War patriot sister, Jemima Condict Harrison (of Daniel), and her spouse Major Aaron Harrison, wrote of American colonial life and of the Boston Tea Party.

Condict graduated from the College of New Jersey (now Princeton University) with a Bachelor of Arts (A.B.) in 1784. After being ordained in 1785 by the Reverend John Witherspoon (then president of Princeton), Condict accepted a calling to serve as pastor to three Presbyterian congregations under the Presbytery of Newton throughout Northwestern New Jersey: Upper Hardwick (now Yellow Frame in Fredon Township, New Jersey), Sussex Court House (now Newton), and Shappenock.

In 1794, Condict was installed at the First Reformed Church in New Brunswick, New Jersey. This calling soon led to him being appointed as Professor of Moral Philosophy at the nearby Queen's College. Despite the college closing in 1795, Condict was appointed to serve as President pro tempore and he dedicated his efforts to the Queen's College Grammar School (now Rutgers Preparatory School) which remained open under Condict's leadership.

During his tenure in New Brunswick, Condit was known for operating a private circulating library, which a person could join as a member by paying modest annual dues. After his death, the library was sold. In 1807, Condict, along with Andrew Kilpatrick, renewed the efforts to reopen Queen's College, securing $12,000 in donations to construct what became Old Queen's (completed in 1823). Shortly after Queen's College reopened, the Board of Trustees offered Condict the full presidency, which he declined, returning to his professorship and to supervise instruction at the college. However, his tenure was short lived.

Condict died of yellow fever on June 1, 1811 in New Brunswick and was buried at the First Reformed Church Cemetery.

== See also ==
- Casper Shafer
- List of Princeton University people
- History of Sussex County, New Jersey
