= Presbytery of Newton =

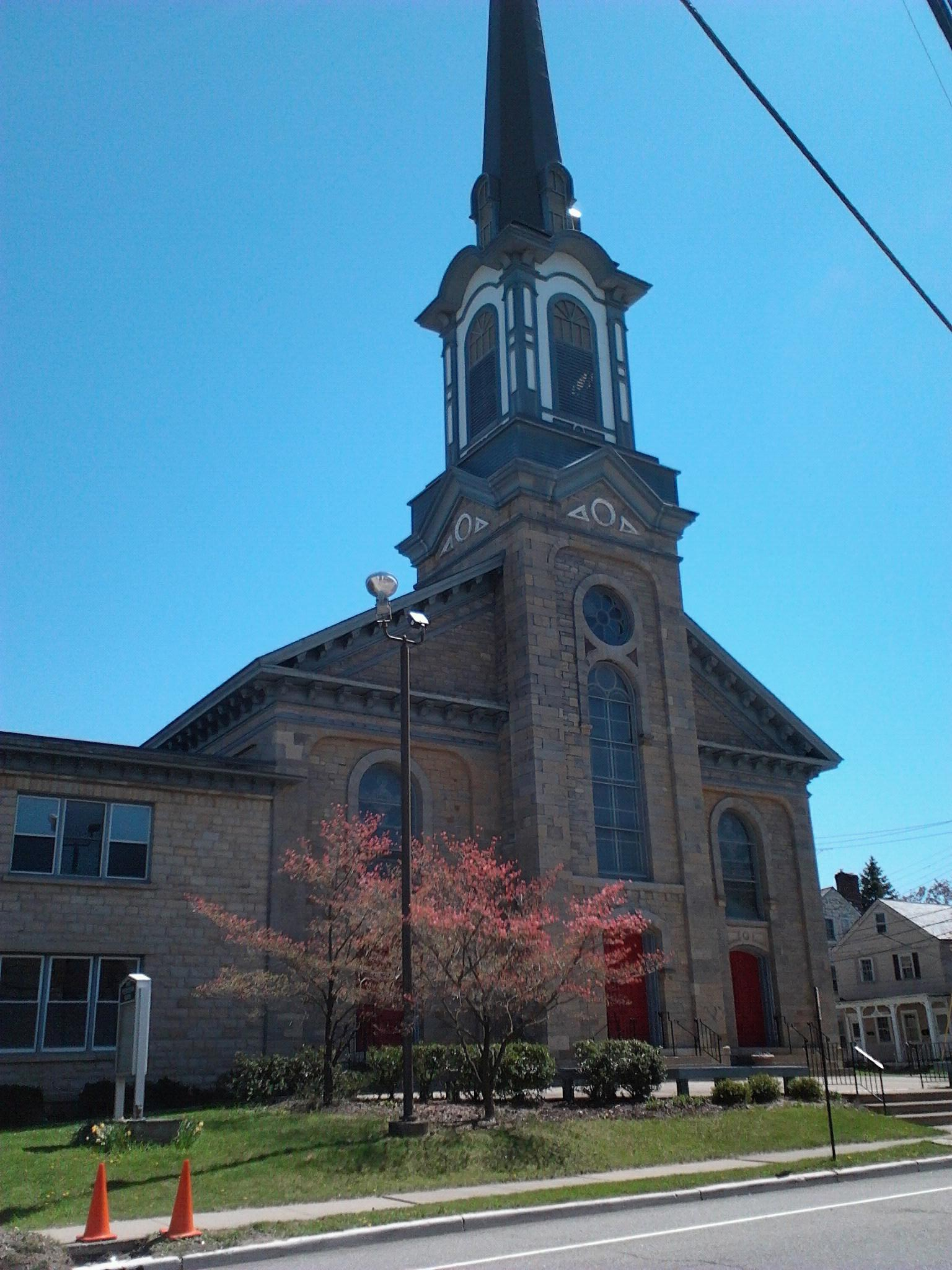
The First Presbyterian Church in Newton, New Jersey, built 1869–1871. The former Presbytery of Newton administered Presbyterian Church affairs for 59 congregations in Northwestern New Jersey.

The former Presbytery of Newton is now part of the Presbytery of the Highlands of New Jersey as of March 1, 2021.

The Presbytery of Newton was a regional governing body for Presbyterian congregations located in northwestern New Jersey and affiliated with the Presbyterian Church (USA). Established in 1817 to oversee congregations in northwestern New Jersey and northeastern Pennsylvania, the Presbytery of Newton included 59 member churches located in the counties of Sussex, Morris, Warren and Hunterdon. The Presbytery of Newton was part of the Synod of the Northeast, which oversees churches in New Jersey, New York, and the New England states.

Aside from these 59 member churches and the presbytery's various mission projects (domestic and overseas), the Presbytery of Newton was also connected to the Johnsonburg Camp and Retreat Center in Johnsonburg, New Jersey, and a private preparatory school, Blair Academy in Blairstown, New Jersey.

== History ==
The Presbytery of Newton was created in October 1817 during a convention of the Synod of New York and New Jersey in October 1817. It was decided to divide the northern territory of the Presbytery of New Brunswick into a new presbytery. The original boundary of the Presbytery of Newton was determined to run from the Delaware River north of Lambertville, New Jersey, including all of Hunterdon, Morris and Sussex Counties (which then included present-day Warren County and stretched west to the ridge of the Pocono Mountains in Pennsylvania including most of Northampton and Monroe counties. At that time, the Presbytery of Newton included 24 churches—in New Jersey the congregations at Knowlton, Hardwick, Marksboro, Newton, Hackettstown, German Valley, Fox Hill, Lamington, Baskingridge, Bethlehem, Kingwood, Alexandria, Greenwich, Harmony, Oxford, Mansfield, Pleasant Grove, Flemington, Amwell 1st and 2nd; and in Pennsylvania 4 congregations at Easton, Lower Mount bethel, Upper Mount Bethel and Smithfield. These 24 congregations shared 9 full-time pastors. Several of the congregations stemmed from ethnic German congregations, including German Valley and Knowlton—communities that were first settled by Palatine Germans and affiliated with either the German Reformed or Lutheran faiths. In 1823, a German and Dutch Reformed congregation at Stillwater (founded in 1769) was received by the Presbytery.
