= Casper and Abraham Shafer Grist Mill Complex =

- U.S. National Register of Historic Places
- New Jersey Register of Historic Places
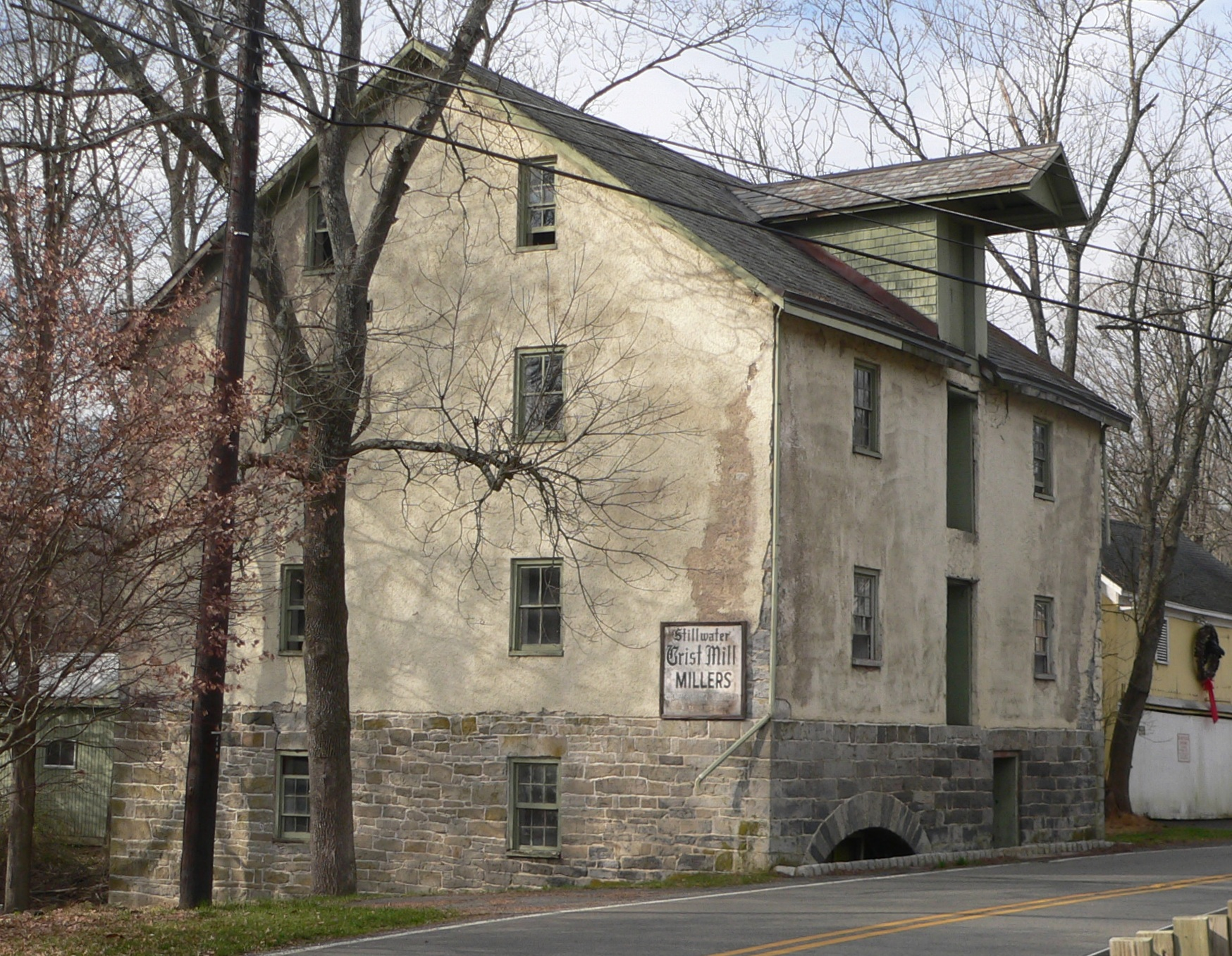
- The Casper and Abraham Shafer Grist Mill Complex in 2011.

- Location within Sussex County, New Jersey Location within New Jersey Location within the United States
- Location: 928 Main Street, Stillwater, New Jersey
- Coordinates: 41°01′59.7″N 74°52′28.8″W
- Area: 16.4 acres (6.6 ha)
- Built: 1764, 1796–1797, 1844
- NRHP reference No.: 09000653
- NJRHP No.: 4899

Significant dates
- Added to NRHP: December 10, 2009
- Designated NJRHP: June 3, 2009

The Casper and Abraham Shafer Grist Mill Complex is located at 928 Main Street in the village of Stillwater in Stillwater Township of Sussex County, New Jersey, United States. The historic grist mill was added to the National Register of Historic Places on December 10, 2009, for its significance in industry. The listing also includes the Miller's House, built around 1800.

In the early 1740s, Casper Shafer (1712–1784) built a dam across the Paulins Kill to provide power for a wooden grist mill near this site. In 1764, he replaced it with a stone grist mill at this site. It was later rebuilt by his son, Abraham Shafer, from 1796 to 1797. After a fire in 1840, it was rebuilt by 1844. The mill features a Leffel water turbine installed in 1893.

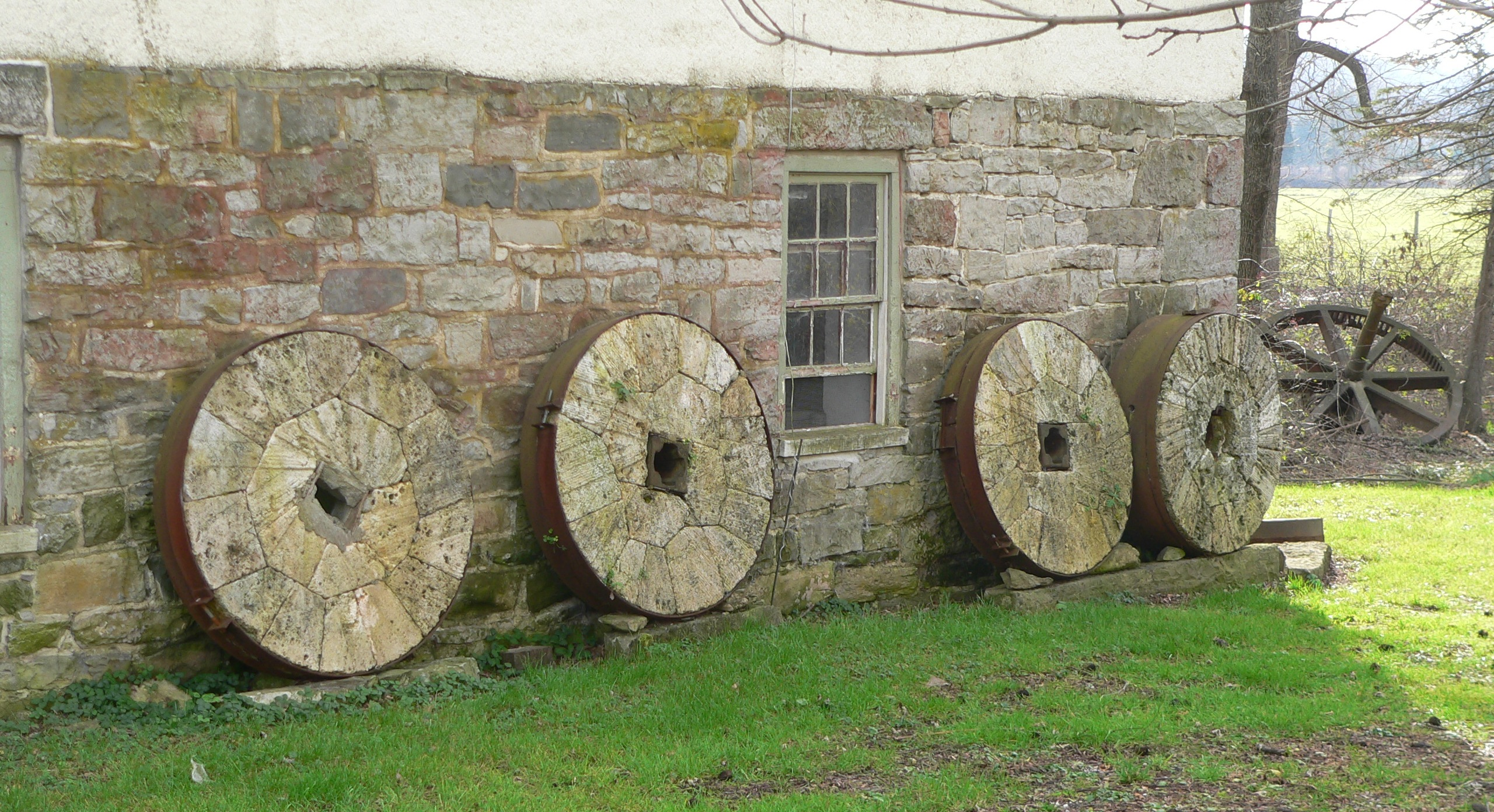
Millstones

== See also ==
- National Register of Historic Places listings in Sussex County, New Jersey
