= Stillwater Cemetery =

Burial ground in Sussex County, New Jersey

Coordinates: 41.0322°N 74.8818°W

Stillwater Cemetery is a burial ground located in the village of Stillwater in Stillwater Township of Sussex County, New Jersey, United States. The cemetery has been in use for over 260 years.

The earliest burials are recorded to have taken place in the 1740s following shortly after the first settlement of this area by Palatine Germans in the middle of the 18th century. These early German graves are noted for their intricately carved headstones and footstones which feature unique German funerary symbolism and in many instances, archaic German text.

The cemetery was also the location of the first two buildings to house the Stillwater Presbyterian Church which in its early years was first a union church serving both the Lutheran and German Reformed faiths. During the late eighteenth and early nineteenth centuries, it was known as the "Dutch Meeting House". It is presumed that the first structure used by this congregation was a rudimentary church made of logs, dating from as early as 1745 to 1750. Subsequently, a second structure built from local fieldstone was erected 1769–1771. This stone church structure was used by the congregations from 1771 to 1837 when it was abandoned for a Greek Revival frame structure built a quarter mile north from this site. The fieldstone structure was razed in 1847 and according to local tradition the stones from the building's walls were used to construct a stone wall along the cemetery's southern and western perimeter. A stone carved with the year "1771"—believed to be the original cornerstone for the church—was incorporated into the cemetery's gate.

== Notable burials ==
Located within the cemetery are several dozen veterans of the French & Indian War, American Revolution, War of 1812, and American Civil War.

- Casper Shafer (1712–1784), early pioneer, miller, member of Provincial Congress of New Jersey and New Jersey General Assembly (1776–1779)
- John George Wintermute (1711–1782), early pioneer of Stillwater

== See also ==
- Harmony Hill United Methodist Church
- History of New Jersey
- History of Sussex County, New Jersey
- Paulins Kill
