= Harmony Hill United Methodist Church =

Historic church in New Jersey, United States

- U.S. National Register of Historic Places
- New Jersey Register of Historic Places
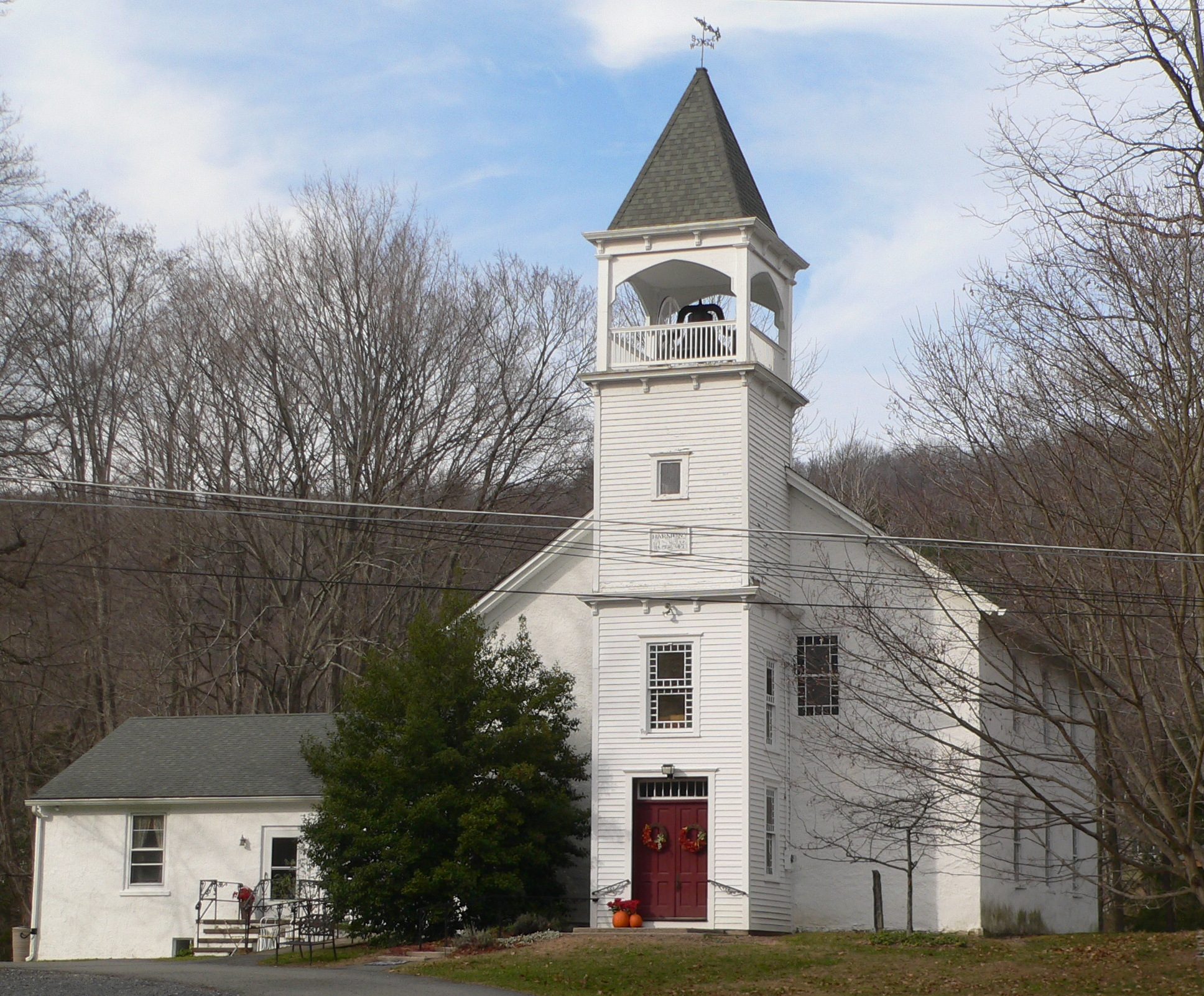

- Location within Sussex County, New Jersey Location within New Jersey Location within the United States
- Location: 919 Fairview Lake Road, Stillwater, New Jersey
- Coordinates: 41°2′33″N 74°52′53″W
- Area: 4.6 acres (1.9 ha)
- Built: 1832
- Architect: Thomas Dildine; John W. Earl
- NRHP reference No.: 77000913
- NJRHP No.: 2632

Significant dates
- Added to NRHP: September 19, 1977
- Designated NJRHP: June 13, 1977

Harmony Hill United Methodist Church is a Methodist Episcopal house of worship affiliated with the United Methodist Church and located about one mile north of the village of Stillwater in Stillwater Township of Sussex County, New Jersey, United States. The historic church was listed on both the New Jersey and National Register of Historic Places in 1977.

== History ==
One of the earliest Methodist congregations organized in both New Jersey and the United States, Harmony Hill Methodist Church was established in 1802 along the Flanders Circuit, a large, nearly 400-mile circuit of several churches in northwestern New Jersey, Southern New York and Pennsylvania that was served by travelling ministers. The congregation met in its early members' barns and homes until the current structure, a wood-frame building, was erected in 1832–1833. Its founders were either previously members (including original founders) of the Stillwater Presbyterian Church when that church was affiliated as a joint Lutheran and German Reformed congregation (before 1822), or from descendants of those founders, as the population of Stillwater assimilated from its Palatine German roots to English-oriented American culture.

== Cemetery ==
Harmony Hill Methodist Church Cemetery, where most of the early parishioners are interred, is located adjacent to the church. Several members of the Main, Savercool, Wintermute and descendants of the early families of Stillwater are buried within the cemetery.

== See also ==
- National Register of Historic Places listings in Sussex County, New Jersey
- Stillwater Cemetery
- First Presbyterian Church (Stillwater, New Jersey)
