= Stillwater Township School District =

School district in Sussex County, New Jersey, US

Coordinates: 41.035099°N 74.879433°W

Address
- 904 Stillwater Road Stillwater Township, Sussex County, New Jersey, 07875; United States

District information
- Grades: PreK-6
- Superintendent: William Kochis
- Business administrator: René Metzgar
- Schools: 1

Students and staff
- Enrollment: 281 (as of 2022–23)
- Faculty: 31.4 FTEs
- Student–teacher ratio: 9.0:1

Other information
- District Factor Group: FG
- Website: District website
Ind.	Per pupil	District spending	Rank (*)	K-6 average	%± vs. average
1A	Total Spending	$18,321	33	$18,891	−3.0%
1	Budgetary Cost	16,762	50	13,649	22.8%
2	Classroom Instruction	10,397	50	8,366	24.3%
6	Support Services	2,450	34	2,161	13.4%
8	Administrative Cost	1,985	58	1,467	35.3%
10	Operations & Maintenance	1,836	44	1,552	18.3%
13	Extracurricular Activities	94	37	39	141.0%
16	Median Teacher Salary	67,800	55	57,437
Data from NJDoE 2014 Taxpayers' Guide to Education Spending. *Of K-6 districts with any number of students. Lowest spending=1; Highest=59

The Stillwater Township School District is a community public school district that serves students in pre-kindergarten through sixth grade from Stillwater Township, in Sussex County, in the U.S. state of New Jersey.

As of the 2022–23 school year, the district, comprised of one school, had an enrollment of 281 students and 31.4 classroom teachers (on an FTE basis), for a student–teacher ratio of 9.0:1.

The district is classified by the New Jersey Department of Education as being in District Factor Group "FG", the fourth-highest of eight groupings. District Factor Groups organize districts statewide to allow comparison by common socioeconomic characteristics of the local districts. From lowest socioeconomic status to highest, the categories are A, B, CD, DE, FG, GH, I and J.

Students in seventh through twelfth grade for public school attend Kittatinny Regional High School located in Hampton Township, which serves students who reside in Fredon Township, Hampton Township, Sandyston Township and Walpack Township. The high school is located on a 96-acre (39 ha) campus in Hampton Township, about seven minutes outside of the county seat of Newton. As of the 2018–19 school year, the high school had an enrollment of 941 students and 97.5 classroom teachers (on an FTE basis), for a student–teacher ratio of 9.7:1. Kittatinny Regional High School was recognized as a National Blue Ribbon School of Excellence in 1997–98.

== School ==
The Stillwater Township School had an enrollment of 262 students in grades PreK-6 as of the 2018–19 school year.

- Marissa Cramer, principal

== Administration ==
Core members of the district's administration are:

- William Kochis, superintendent
- René Metzgar, business administrator and board secretary

== Board of education ==
The district's board of education, comprised of nine members, sets policy and oversees the fiscal and educational operation of the district through its administration. As a Type II school district, the board's trustees are elected directly by voters to serve three-year terms of office on a staggered basis, with three seats up for election each year held (since 2012) as part of the November general election. The board appoints a superintendent to oversee the district's day-to-day operations and a business administrator to supervise the business functions of the district.
