= Middleville, New Jersey =

Populated place in Sussex County, New Jersey, US

- Unincorporated community
- Middleville's location in Sussex County (Inset: Sussex County in New Jersey) Middleville, New Jersey (New Jersey) Middleville, New Jersey (the United States)
- Coordinates: 41°03′21″N 74°51′47″W
- Country: United States
- State: New Jersey
- County: Sussex
- Township: Stillwater
- Elevation: 525 ft (160 m)
- Time zone: UTC−05:00 (Eastern (EST))
  - Summer (DST): UTC−04:00 (EDT)
- ZIP Code: 07855
- Area codes: 862 & 973
- GNIS feature ID: 878319

Middleville is an unincorporated community located within Stillwater Township, in Sussex County, in the U.S. state of New Jersey. Middleville is 5.8 miles (9.3 km) west of Newton. Middleville has a post office with ZIP Code 07855.
