= Henry Finkelstein =

American painter

Henry Finkelstein (born 1958) is an American artist and teacher. He is best known for his landscape paintings.

Finkelstein is the son of artists Louis Finkelstein and Gretna Campbell. He grew up spending the summers with his family on Great Cranberry Island, Maine, and attended Cooper Union art school in New York City, where he studied with Rueben Kadish and Nick Marsicano. In 1983 he received an MFA from Yale School of Art, and has taught at the National Academy of Design since 1996.

He has maintained the home in Maine, as well as a residence in the north of France. The landscape of both locations figures prominently in his work. Finkelstein has attributed his interest in color to a childhood visit to France. “I noticed that color was relative. Color was not a fixed thing. I began to see colors in nature I had not seen before. I never left that, really.”

Although he works from life, Finkelstein is influenced especially by painters of the Abstract Expressionism movement. In addition to instructing at the National Academy and the Art Students League of New York, Finkelstein has taught and lectured at Brooklyn College, Haverford College, Maryland Institute College of Art, Pennsylvania Academy of Fine Arts, the University of the Arts in Philadelphia and Lyme Academy College of Fine Arts. Among the awards he's received are a Fulbright Fellowship for Painting in Italy in 1983, the Julius Hallgarten Prize at the National Academy, and a French government grant.
