= Aaron Hankinson =

American politician

- Born: February 7, 1735; Matawan, Province of New Jersey
- Died: October 9, 1806 (age 71); Stillwater Township, New Jersey
- Occupations: farmer, military officer, legislator

Aaron Hankinson (February 7, 1735 – October 9, 1806) was a military officer during the American Revolution and politician who served in the New Jersey state legislature.

Hankinson was born on February 7, 1735, in Matawan in Monmouth County, Province of New Jersey, to Rachel Mattison (1707–1784) and Joseph Hankinson (1706–1783). During his youth, the family moved to Rowland Mills in Readington Township in the northern Highlands region of Hunterdon County. On February 9, 1764, he married Mary Snyder (1740–1806), and relocated to Sussex County north of the present-day village of Stillwater, then in Upper Hardwick. His father purchased 363 acres which he divided between Aaron and his brother William (1737–1796).

On July 26, 1775, Hankinson was commissioned a captain in the Sussex County Militia, commanded by Colonel Ephraim Martin. He was raised to Colonel the following year and stationed at Sandy Hook to defend the New Jersey coast along New York Harbor. In 1777, the Sussex County Militia fought at the Battle of Brandywine Creek and arrived late at the Battle of Germantown near Philadelphia. Later in the war, Hankinson and the militia were stationed in the Minisink, a region encompassing the area north of the Delaware Water Gap surrounding the Delaware River's valley in northwestern New Jersey and northeastern Pennsylvania, and the Neversink River in Orange County, New York. Here, after the burning of Machackameck (now Port Jervis, New York), the militia was ordered to prevent incursions by British loyalists, tories, and their allied Indian tribes (Munsee, Lenape, Iroquois) under Captain Joseph Brant. This region was formerly defended by Pulaski's Legion before their deployment to operations in South Carolina. At the close of the war, Hankinson was promoted to Brigadier General.

After the conclusion of the Revolution, Hankinson was elected to serve in the New Jersey General Assembly, and served several terms from 1782 to 1786 and 1788 to 1792. In Memoirs and Reminiscences, Schaeffer describes Hankinson as "a farmer by occupation, an elder and leading member of the Hardwick church, and at one time chorister of the same. The old gentleman was a good kind of man."

Hankinson died on October 9, 1806, and was buried in the churchyard of the Yellow Frame Presbyterian Church (known then as Upper Hardwick) presently located on the border between Fredon Township and Frelinghuysen Township, New Jersey. The inscription on his tombstone reads:

A.H.
In Memory
Brg. General
Aaron Hankinson
Who departed this life
Oct IX 1806
Aged 71 years 8 months 2 days
Let all his children in a word
Unite and praise the eternal God
For the sweet hope that he has gone
To rest with Christ God's only Son

Hankinson and his wife Mary (née Snyder) had 13 children, and among his descendants include William A. Newell, former Governor of New Jersey.
