= Casper Shafer =

American businessman

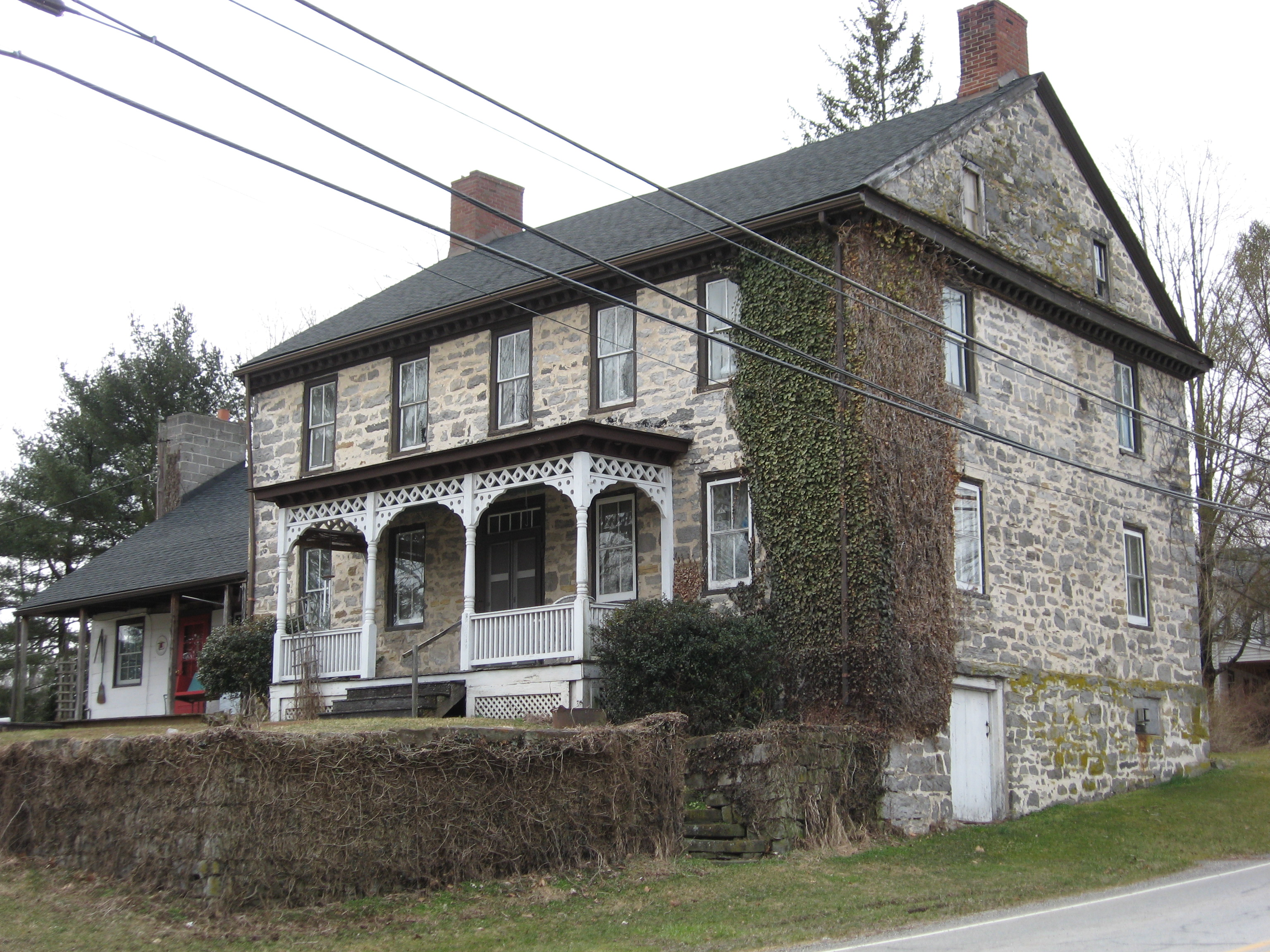
Casper Shafer's house in Stillwater, New Jersey—the log cabin portion of the structure (left) was built c.1742, the main stone section (right) c. 1750. The architecture is typical of colonial-era and early American houses built by the Palatine German emigrants who settled in the Paulins Kill valley.

Casper Shafer (c. 1712— 17 December 1784) was among the first settlers of the village of Stillwater along the Paulins Kill in Sussex County, New Jersey, United States. A successful miller and early tavern owner, Shafer later served in the first sessions of the New Jersey Legislature during the American Revolution. During these sessions, New Jersey had become a newly independent state, established the first state constitution, ordered the state's last Royal Governor deposed and arrested, and actively supported and financed the Continental Army.

== Biography ==
=== Early life and emigration ===
Shafer was born in 1712 in the Rheinland-Pfalz in present-day Germany. He was among tens of thousands of German Palatines who escaped conditions of war and poverty in southwestern Germany throughout the eighteenth century and journeyed up the Rhine River to Rotterdam seeking passage to the New World. From Rotterdam, Shafer emigrated to the American colonies aboard the ship Queen Elizabeth commanded by Alexander Hope, and entered Philadelphia on 16 September 1738. At some time after 1741, Shafer married Maria Catrina Bernhardt (1722–1794), the daughter of Johan Peter Bernhardt (d. 1748). Shafer, his father-in-law, Johan Peter Bernhardt, his brother-in-law John George Wintermute (1711-1782), and their families settled along the Paulins Kill in northwestern New Jersey circa 1742. Over the next few decades, more German Palatine families settled here, and this settlement became the village of Stillwater.

=== In New Jersey ===
During the first year the conditions were spartan, and the settlers shared a log cabin located over a large stump which served as the family's table. Shafer's four children were all born in Stillwater—Peter (1744–1799), Margaretta (1745–1815), Abraham (1754–1820) and Isaac (1760–1800).

A few years after settling, Shafer erected a rudimentary grist mill along the Paulins Kill approximately 900 yards north of the site of the surviving larger mill he built in 1764. This first mill ground out three-to-five bushels of flour per day." In later years, Shafer built a saw mill, oil-mill and tannery at the site. To assist in the agricultural and industrial work, he acquired several African-American slaves, many of whom remained property of his descendants well into the 19th century. Shafer also established large orchards on his property in Stillwater, mostly of apple trees that were later described as growing to "a majestic size, some of them attaining to over three feet in diameter at the butt." When Sussex County was established in 1753, the first session of the Court of General Sessions granted licenses to Shafer and a few other early residents to operate taverns.

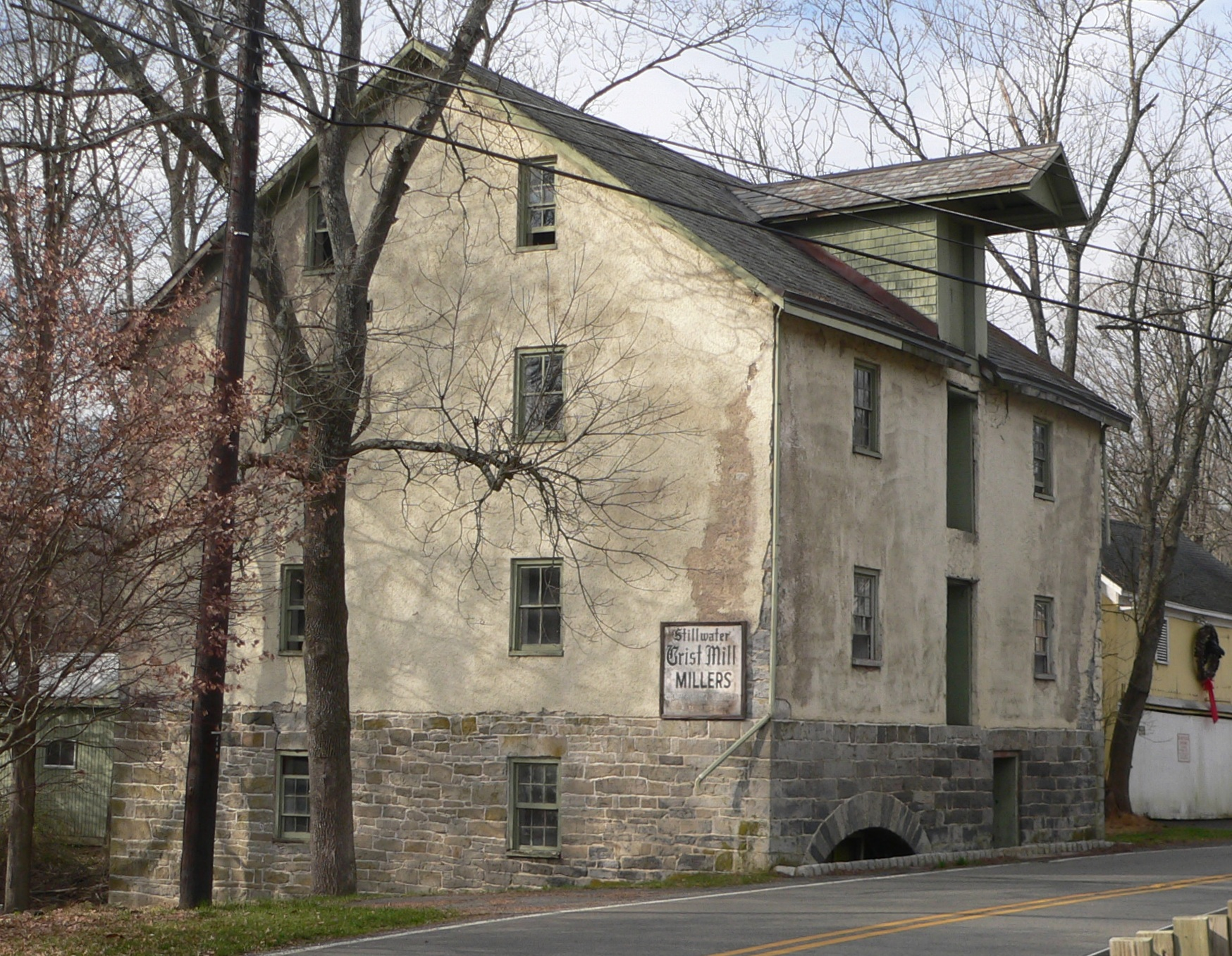
Casper Shafer (1711–1784) constructed Stillwater's second mill in 1764 replacing a small mill 900 yards north of the current site. After an 1844 fire, the mill was reconstructed.

Each year, Shafer would navigate down the Paulins Kill and Delaware River by flatboat "carrying flour and other produce down to the Philadelphia market" and returning with "such goods as the wants of the country in its primitive state seemed to demand.", The pattern of trade in the region was focused toward Philadelphia, and for several years Shafer did not have any knowledge of English coastal cities in Newark Bay. The local Munsee (a Lenape phratry) informed him of a town they called Lispatone—that is, Elizabethtown (present-day Elizabeth, New Jersey)—which he had not heard of. According to Schaeffer, "he journeyed in that direction some fifty miles over the mountains and through the almost trackless wilderness, until he finally arrived at the veritable town...where he commenced trading in his small way. And thus he was the pioneer in opening a profitable and important commercial intercourse between the south eastern sea-board, and that part of New Jersey." It was not until 1756-1757 that a military supply road built by Jonathan Hampton during the French & Indian War opened up a connection for trade between Elizabeth and Morristown with the northwestern frontier.

In 1775, Shafer was a member of the Committee of Safety for Sussex County, and was charged with raising £10,000 to "purchase arms and ammunition and for other exigencies of the Province." The following year, Shafer, Thomas Peterson and Abia Brown represented the County in the Provincial Congress whose session began at Burlington on 10 June 1776 establishing the government as the former colony became an independent state, deposed and imprisoned the Royal Governor, William Franklin, and established the state's first constitution. In August, the Provincial Congress met in Princeton and transformed into the state's first Legislature. According to Snell, on several occasions Shafer would rise to his feet exclaiming his dissent in German, saying "Das ist nicht recht! Das ist nicht recht!" (trans. "That is not right! That is not right!") and positing his argument in his adopted English. He represented the county for the next three years, and was described as "faithful in his attendance at the various meetings at Princeton, Trenton, Burlington and Haddonfield. His vote is recorded on almost every question, and always in favor of the most vigorous and aggressive measures for carrying on the war."

=== Death and legacy ===
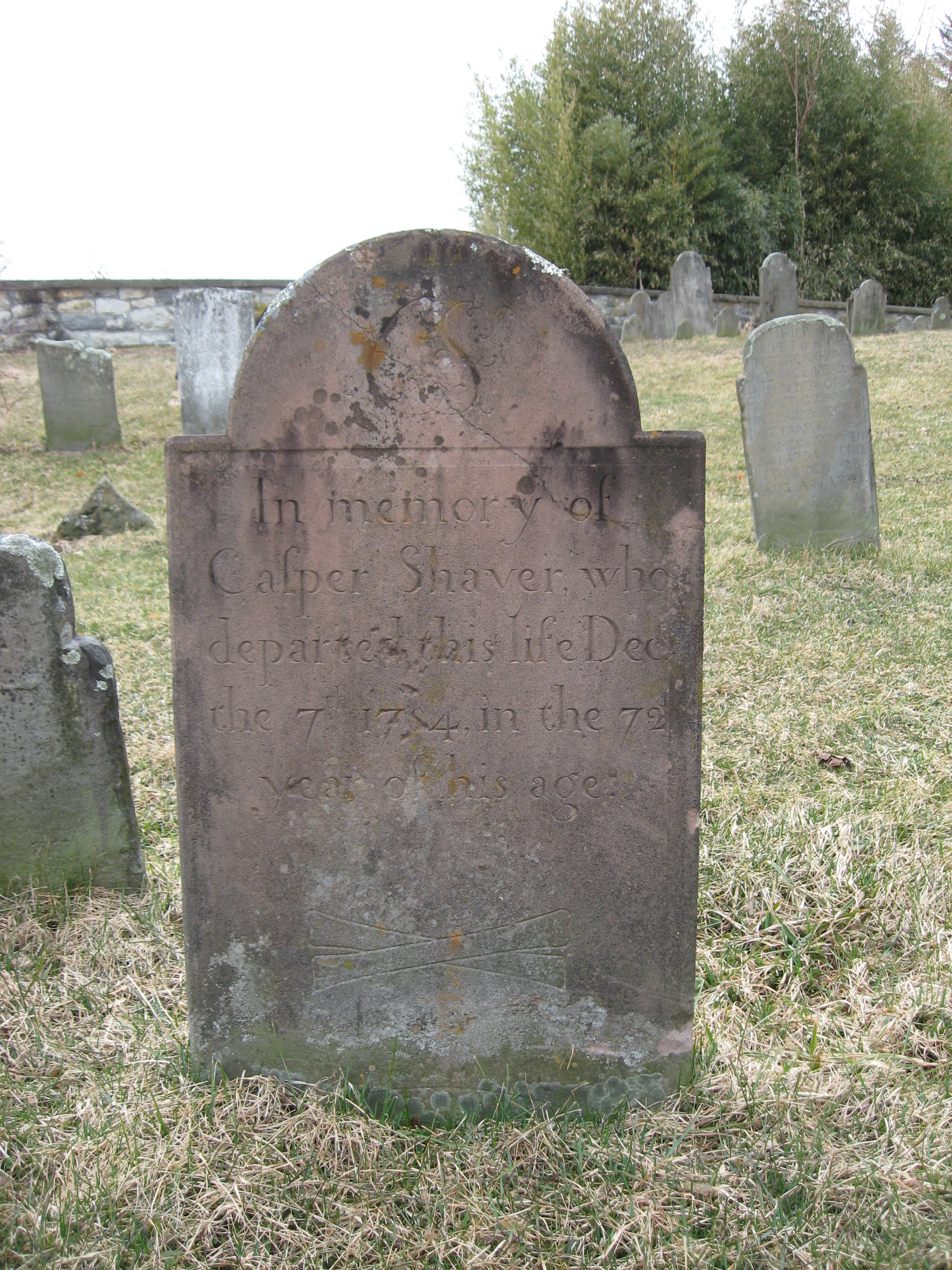
The gravestone of Casper Shafer in Stillwater Cemetery

Casper Shafer died on 7 February 1784 in Stillwater. Shafer disagreed on matters of doctrine with the German Reformed and Lutheran clergy who supplied the local church, the "Dutch Meeting House" (now a presbyterian congregation), and in his last years became cordially acquainted with Presbyterian clergyman Rev. Ira Condict (1764–1811). Condict, who would later become President of Queen's College (now Rutgers University) had been called to serve the nearby Presbyterian congregations at Upper Hardwick (now Yellow Frame Presbyterian Church) and at Sussex Court House (now Newton). Shafer requested that Condict perform his burial service, but because the German clergy objected to Condict using the church building, Condict eulogized Shafer from the church's front steps. Casper Shafer was buried in the Stillwater Cemetery. His tombstone reads:

C. S.
In memory of
Casper Shaver, who
departed this life Dec.
the 7th, 1784, in the 72
year of his age.

On 10 December 2009, the grist mill built by Casper Shafer, and operated after his death by his son Abraham, was listed as the Casper and Abraham Shafer Grist Mill Complex on the state and National Register of Historic Places. The site is currently maintained by the Ridge and Valley Conservancy, a nonprofit organization dedicated to local environmental protection and historic preservation. It is frequently open for public visitation and educational events.
