= First Presbyterian Church (Stillwater, New Jersey) =

Church building in New Jersey, United States of America

Coordinates: 41.036506°N 74.878424°W

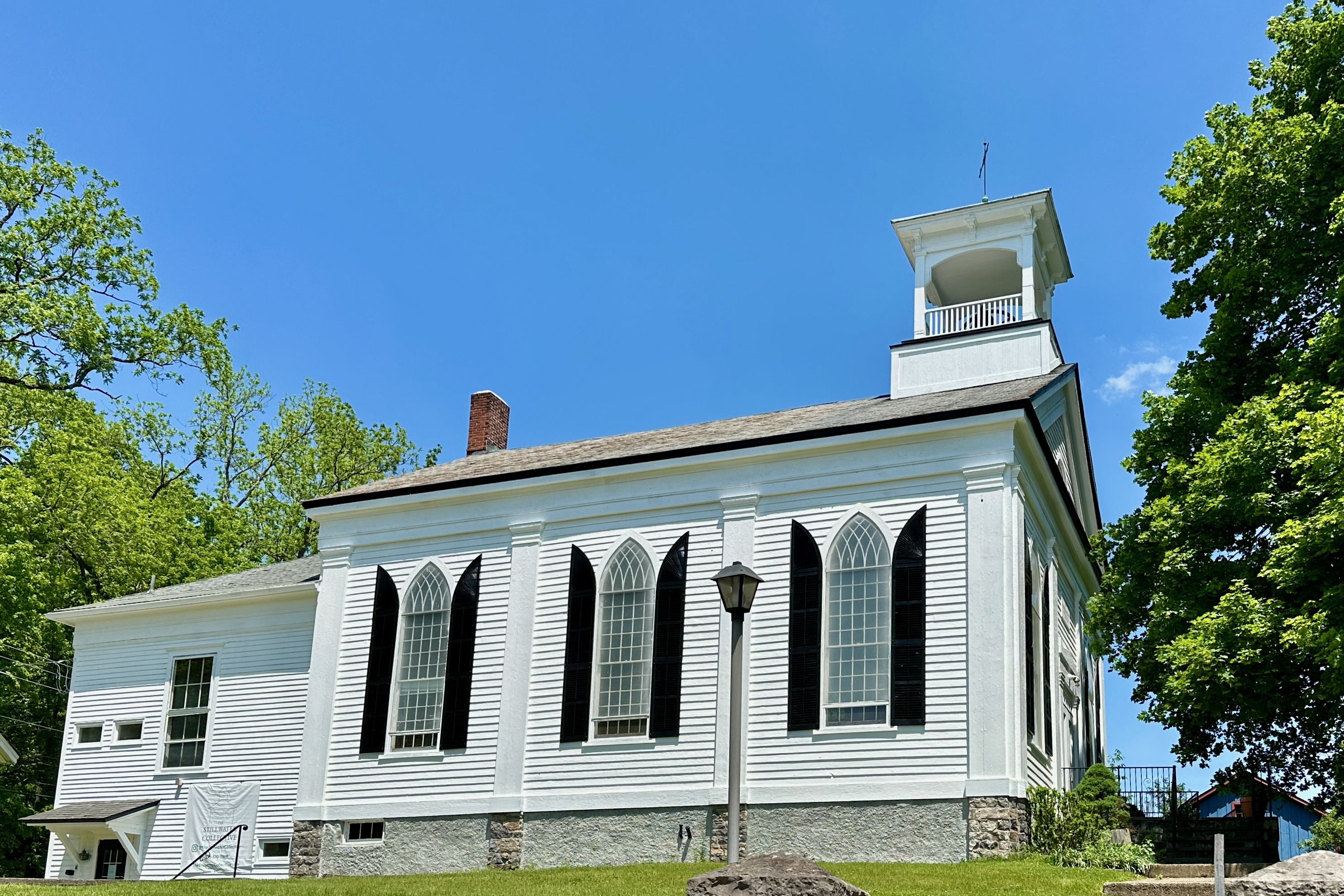
First Presbyterian Church in Stillwater, New Jersey

The Stillwater Presbyterian Church (also known as the First Presbyterian Church of Stillwater) was a congregation of the Presbyterian Church (USA) located in the village of Stillwater in Stillwater Township of Sussex County, New Jersey, in the United States. It was a member of the Presbytery of the Highlands. Founded in 1769 as a union church shared by members of the Reformed and Lutheran faiths, the parish, now Presbyterian, closed in 2019.

== History ==
This congregation was formally organized in 1769 as a union church shared by the Lutheran and German Reformed (Calvinist) faiths. Construction of a stone house of worship was finished in 1771. Stillwater and the surrounding Paulins Kill valley was settled chiefly by Palatine German immigrants in the 18th century, beginning in 1741 with the arrival of Casper Shafer, John George Wintermute, Johan Peter Bernhardt and their families. The first few families likely held prayer services in their homes with their neighbors. Early Stillwater families are mentioned in the records of the Dutch Reformed congregations in the Minisink Valley (along the Delaware River), and likely journeyed over Kittatinny Mountain to attend services in Walpack. As the area's population grew and the village of Stillwater developed, its Christian community was served by clergymen who travelled a circuit of churches in remote, sparsely inhabited regions. Clergymen were provided as "stated supply" by the Dutch Reformed or Calvinist Synod (or Classis) in New Brunswick, New Jersey or the Lutheran Church (Evangelical Lutheran Ministerium) in Philadelphia, Pennsylvania. The congregation did not have a permanent clergyman until the 1780s.

From 1769 to 1771, a church building was constructed from local fieldstone in the older section of Stillwater Cemetery. This church, known as the Dutch Meeting House, Reformed Association of Hardwick, and Lutheran Congregation of Hardwick, served the large German population that settled the Paulins Kill valley and the surrounding area in the middle of the eighteenth century. In 1823, with the area's German population either dying off, migrating to territories in the American West or assimilating into English-oriented American culture, the congregation petitioned the Presbytery of Newton to affiliate with the Presbyterian faith.

By the 1830s, the stone church was beginning to become structurally unsound, and the current structure, an frame structure that is an example of Greek Revival architecture, although featuring Gothic Revival (Carpenter Gothic) windows, was erected in 1837–1838 at a cost of $2,000. Additions to this structure, largely to support the church's "Sunday school" (children's Christian education) and fellowship activities, were built in 1910, 1959, and 1990.

It is likely the third structure used by this congregation—the first presumed to be a rudimentary log building erected circa 1745–1750 that occupied the site in the Stillwater Cemetery of the fieldstone structure which succeeded it. Local tradition asserts that the fieldstone wall of Stillwater Cemetery was built with stones from the abandoned stone structure when it was dismantled in 1847. A stone with "1771" carved into its face (likely the cornerstone from the former structure) is incorporated into the cemetery gate.

== See also ==
- Harmony Hill United Methodist Church
- Stillwater Cemetery
