= Louis Finkelstein (artist) =

American painter and academic (1923–2000)

- Born: 1923; New York City, U.S.
- Died: 20 June 2000 (aged 76–77); New York City, U.S.
- Education: Cooper Union, Art Students League of New York, Brooklyn Museum School of Art
- Occupations: Painter, art critic, professor
- Known for: Painting, art education
- Notable work: Exhibited at Whitney Museum of American Art, Corcoran Gallery, Pennsylvania Academy, Yale University
- Movement: Post-Impressionism
- Spouse: Gretna Campbell (d. 1987) Jane Culp (m. 1989)
- Children: Henry Finkelstein, Martha Finkelstein
- Awards: College Art Association Award (1979), NEA Grant, Fulbright Grant, Honorary Doctorate (Maryland Institute College of Art, 1999)

Louis Finkelstein (1923 – 20 June 2000) was an American painter, art critic and professor who taught for at Queens College, City University of New York. Several of his works have been compared to those of French artist and Post-Impressionist painter Paul Cézanne (1839–1906).

== Biography ==
Born in New York City in 1923, Louis Finkelstein studied painting at the Cooper Union, the Art Students League of New York and the Brooklyn Museum School of Art that used to be located in the museum as a part of the Brooklyn Museum of Art.

Finkelstein was an artist and an educator. He was an articulate speaker and writer on art. He taught at the Philadelphia College of Art, Yale School of Art (where he served as interim dean of the Art School from 1962 to 1964), and he was the head of the art department at Queens College, CUNY for more than 25 years. In 1979, he received the College Art Association's award for distinguished teaching and in 1999, was awarded an honorary doctorate in the fine arts from the Maryland Institute College of Art. Finkelstein received several Fulbright grants, an NEA for painting, and he was a member of the National Academy of Design.

His paintings have been shown at Yale University, the New York Studio School, the Riverside Museum, the Whitney Museum of American Art, the Corcoran Gallery and the Pennsylvania Academy.

On 20 June 2000, Finkelstein died in hospice in New York City.

Finkelstein was married to artist Gretna Campbell (d. 1987) by whom he had two children, a son, artist Henry Finkelstein (b. 1958), and a daughter, Martha. On 8 November 1989, he married his second wife Jane Culp.
