= Gretna Campbell =

American painter

- Born: 1922; Bronx, New York
- Died: July 14, 1987 (aged 64–65); New York City, New York
- Education: Evander Childs High School; Cooper Union Day Art School
- Known for: Landscape art
- Style: Abstract expressionism
- Spouse: Louis Finklestein
- Awards: Fulbright Fellowship, Purchase Award from American Academy and Institute of Arts and Letters Annual Exhibition 1984
- Elected: Associate, National Academy of Design
- Website: www.gretnacampbell.com//

Gretna Campbell Finkelstein (1922 – July 14, 1987) was an American painter and educator who was affiliated with the abstract expressionist New York School. Campbell's works are described as having developed "among a generation of painters respectful of the achievements of Abstract Expressionism but confident that depictions of the natural world remained timely and significant."

Born in The Bronx, Campbell began formal studies in painting in 1939 attending an art workshop organized by the Works Progress Administration (WPA), and continued at Cooper Union and the Art Students League in New York City. In 1946, she married fellow New York School artist Louis Finkelstein (1923-2000). After studies in France, and Italy, and brief stints in Provincetown on Cape Cod, she settled into spending her summers painting on Cranberry Island, Maine and the rest of the year in New York City.

Campbell taught at the Brooklyn Museum, Philadelphia College of Art, Yale School of Art, Maryland Institute College of Art, and the New York Studio School. From 1978 to 1986, she and her husband settled in Stillwater Township, New Jersey where she began painting in the winter and spring until her final illness. In 1987, she was elected into the National Academy of Design as an associate member.

On 14 July 1987, Gretna Campbell died in New York City.
