= List of Sussex County, New Jersey fire departments =

There are several fire service agencies which cover various areas and municipalities in Sussex County, New Jersey in the United States.

== State agencies ==
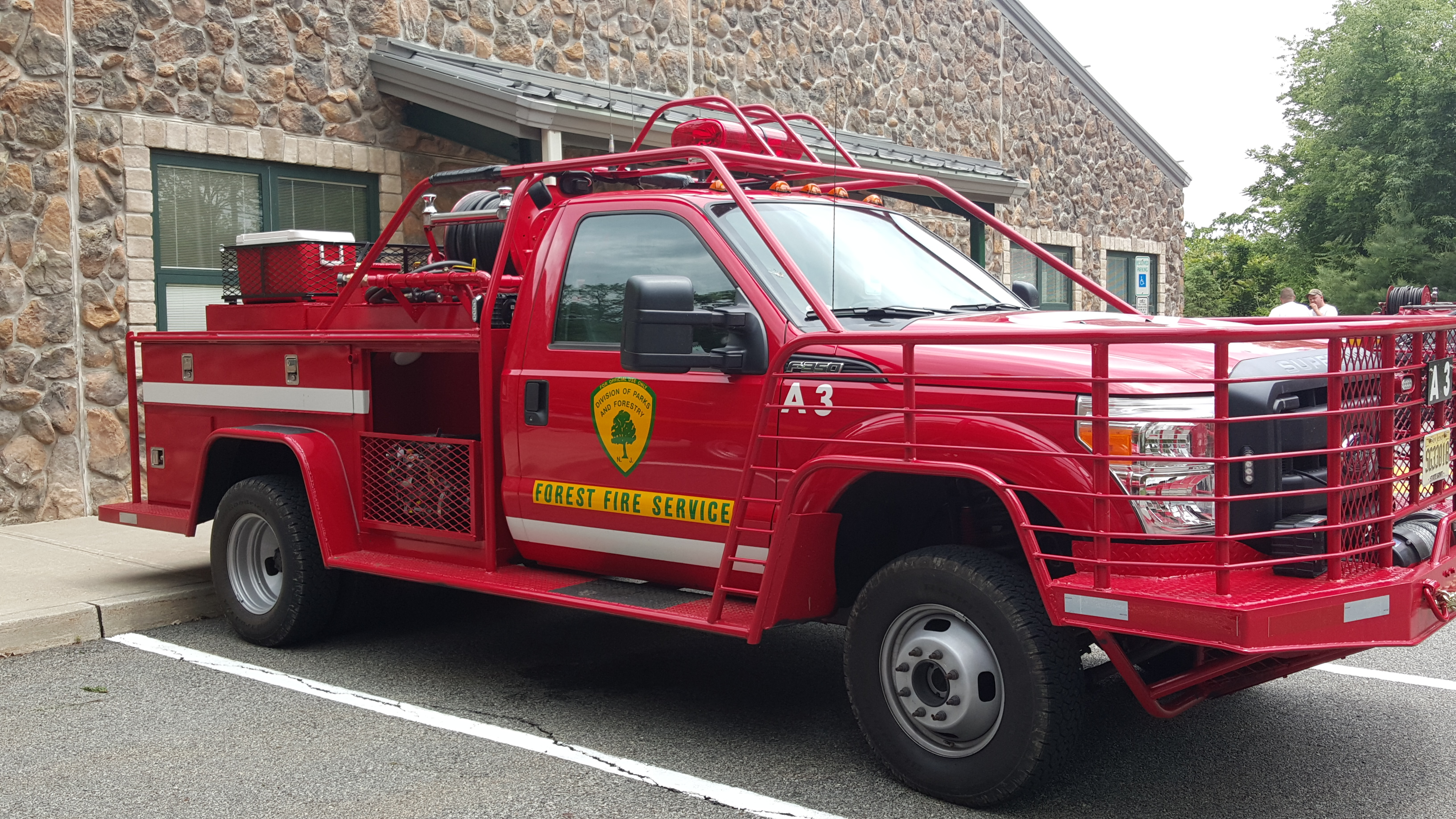
Built from a Ford F350 pickup truck frame, this NJFFS Brush Engine is a Type 6 Wildland Engine.

- New Jersey Forest Fire Service, Division A. The agency's Division A headquarters and its air attack base (Aeroflex–Andover Airport) is located in the county at Kittatinny Valley State Park in Andover Township. Division A covers 1,954,353 acres (790,899 ha) of northern New Jersey north of the Raritan River, including the area of Bergen, Essex, Hunterdon, Morris, Passaic, Somerset, Sussex, Union, Warren and parts of Mercer and Middlesex counties. Sussex County is covered by the agency's sections A1, A3, and A4.

New Jersey Forest Fire Service is also known as Sussex County Station 99 Fire.

== County agencies ==
Sussex County does not have a county-wide fire department. The county's fire marshal and office of emergency management is overseen by the Sussex County Sheriff's Office. The fire marshal enforces the state's Uniform Fire Code in county-owned buildings and assist local fire officials with enforcement of same, coordinate incident activities once a fire-related incident has grown beyond a local fire department’s span of control, investigates fire incidents for causes, and educates the public on fire safety and fire protection matters.

Sussex County Community College offers courses and training to firefighting personnel at its Public Safety academy located in Hampton Township, New Jersey.

== Municipal departments ==
Sussex County has 24 municipalities. None of these municipalities has a paid fire department staffed with municipal employees. All fire departments in the county at the municipal or local level are unpaid, volunteer fire departments. Several of these fire departments incorporate a rescue or emergency medical services component.

Station #	Company	Municipality	Founded	Comments
22	Andover Boro Fire Department	Andover Borough	-	-
32	Andover Township Volunteer Fire Department	Andover Township	-	-
64	Beemerville Fire Department	Wantage Township	-	One of two departments in Wantage Township
43	Byram Township Fire Department	Byram Township	-	-
24	Branchville Hose Company 1	Branchville Borough	-	-
25	Frankford Township Fire Department	Frankford Township	-	-
31	Franklin Fire Department	Franklin Borough	-	-
27	Fredon Volunteer Fire Company	Fredon Township	-	-
95	Green Township Fire Department	Green Township	-	-
26	Hamburg Fire Department	Hamburg Borough	-	-
48	Hampton Township Fire and Rescue	Hampton Township	-	-
28	Hardyston Township Fire Department	Hardyston Township	-	-
47	Highland Lakes Volunteer Fire Department	Vernon Township	-	One of four department covering Vernon Township; covers the Highland Lakes area including Barry Lakes, Lake Wanda, Laurel Lake and Cliffwood Lake plus Wawayanda State Park and the Vernon section of the Warwick Turnpike.
33	Hopatcong Fire Department	Hopatcong Borough	-	-
85	Lafayette Fire Department	Lafayette Township	-	-
44	McAfee Fire Department	Vernon Township	-	One of four department covering Vernon Township; covers the McAfee area including Scenic Lakes, Cedar Ridge, Sun Valley and Great Gorge condominiums.
35	Montague Volunteer Fire Department	Montague Township	-	-
36	Newton Fire Department	Newton (town)	-	-
21	Ogdensburg Fire Department	Ogdensburg Borough	-	-
46	Pochuck Valley Fire Department	Vernon Township	-	One of four department covering Vernon Township; covers the Pochuck Valley area including Lake Wallkill, Lake Glenwood, Lake Panorama and Tall Timbers.
38	Sandyston Township Volunteer Fire Department	Sandyston Township	-	-
41	Sparta Township Fire Department	Sparta Township	-	-
23	Stanhope Hose Company	Stanhope Borough	-	-
42	Stillwater Area Volunteer Fire Company	Stillwater Township	-	
69	Sussex Fire Department	Sussex Borough	-	-
45	Vernon Township Fire Department	Vernon Township	-	One of four department covering Vernon Township; covers the Vernon Valley area and assists the other three departments with direct response in their areas.
62	Colesville Fire Company	Wantage Township	-	One of two departments serving Wantage Township
