= Hampton Township School District (New Jersey) =

School district in Sussex County, New Jersey, US

Address
- One School Road Newton, Sussex County, New Jersey, 07860
- Coordinates: 41.110901°N 74.755653°W

District information
- Grades: K-6
- Superintendent: Craig Hutcheson
- Business administrator: Kate Fedge
- Schools: 1

Students and staff
- Enrollment: 323 (as of 2022–23)
- Faculty: 39.2 FTEs
- Student–teacher ratio: 8.2:1

Other information
- District Factor Group: GH
- Website: www.mckeown.org
Ind.	Per pupil	District spending	Rank (*)	K-6 average	%± vs. average
1A	Total Spending	$19,460	45	$18,891	3.0%
1	Budgetary Cost	16,659	49	13,649	22.1%
2	Classroom Instruction	10,494	51	8,366	25.4%
6	Support Services	1,985	20	2,161	−8.1%
8	Administrative Cost	1,981	54	1,467	35.0%
10	Operations & Maintenance	2,118	51	1,552	36.5%
13	Extracurricular Activities	81	34	39	107.7%
16	Median Teacher Salary	62,004	44	57,437
Data from NJDoE 2014 Taxpayers' Guide to Education Spending. *Of K-6 districts with any number of students. Lowest spending=1; Highest=59

The Hampton Township School District is a comprehensive community public school district that serves students in kindergarten through sixth grade from Hampton Township, in Sussex County, in the U.S. state of New Jersey.

As of the 2022–23 school year, the district, comprising one school, had an enrollment of 323 students and 39.2 classroom teachers (on an FTE basis), for a student–teacher ratio of 8.2:1.

The district is classified by the New Jersey Department of Education as being in District Factor Group "GH", the third-highest of eight groupings. District Factor Groups organize districts statewide to allow comparison by common socioeconomic characteristics of the local districts. From lowest socioeconomic status to highest, the categories are A, B, CD, DE, FG, GH, I and J.

Students in seventh through twelfth grade for public school attend Kittatinny Regional High School located in Hampton Township, which serves students who reside in Fredon, Hampton, Sandyston, Stillwater and Walpack townships. The high school is located on a 96-acre (39 ha) campus in Hampton Township, about seven minutes outside of the county seat of Newton. As of the 2022–23 school year, the high school had an enrollment of 781 students and 79.5 classroom teachers (on an FTE basis), for a student–teacher ratio of 9.8:1. Kittatinny Regional High School was recognized as a National Blue Ribbon School of Excellence in 1997-98.

== Schools ==
Schools in the district (with 2022–23 enrollment data from the National Center for Education Statistics) are:

Elementary school

- Marian Emmons McKeown School, with 323 students in grades K-6
  - Janet Goodwin, principal

== Administration ==
Core members of the district's administration are:

- Craig Hutcheson, superintendent
- Kate Fedge, school business administrator and board secretary

== Board of education ==
The district's board of education, comprised of nine members, sets policy and oversees the fiscal and educational operation of the district through its administration. As a Type II school district, the board's trustees are elected directly by voters to serve three-year terms of office on a staggered basis, with three seats up for election each year held (since 2012) as part of the November general election. The board appoints a superintendent to oversee the district's day-to-day operations and a business administrator to supervise the business functions of the district.
