= Fredon Township School District =

School district in Sussex County, New Jersey, US

Address
- 459 Route 94 Fredon Township, Sussex County, New Jersey, 07860; United States
- Coordinates: 41.034719°N 74.815094°W

District information
- Grades: PreK-6
- Superintendent: Kelly Hart
- Business administrator: Erin Siipola
- Schools: 1

Students and staff
- Enrollment: 204 (as of 2024–25)
- Faculty: 19.4 FTEs
- Student–teacher ratio: 10.5:1

Other information
- District Factor Group: GH
- Website: www.fredon.org
Ind.	Per pupil	District spending	Rank (*)	K-6 average	%± vs. average
1A	Total Spending	$17,203	26	$18,891	−8.9%
1	Budgetary Cost	14,201	30	13,649	4.0%
2	Classroom Instruction	7,827	12	8,366	−6.4%
6	Support Services	2,653	43	2,161	22.8%
8	Administrative Cost	1,984	57	1,467	35.2%
10	Operations & Maintenance	1,545	29	1,552	−0.5%
13	Extracurricular Activities	169	41	39	333.3%
16	Median Teacher Salary	52,007	11	57,437
Data from NJDoE 2014 Taxpayers' Guide to Education Spending. *Of K-6 districts with any number of students. Lowest spending=1; Highest=59

Fredon Township School District (FTSD) is a community public school district that serves students in pre-kindergarten through sixth grade from Fredon Township, in Sussex County, in the U.S. state of New Jersey.

As of the 2024–25 school year, the district, comprised of one school, had an enrollment of 204 students and 19.4 classroom teachers (on an FTE basis), for a student–teacher ratio of 10.5:1.

Students in seventh through twelfth grade for public school attend Kittatinny Regional High School located in Hampton Township, which serves students who reside in Fredon Township, Hampton Township, Sandyston Township, Stillwater Township and Walpack Township. The high school is located on a 96-acre (39 ha) campus in Hampton Township, about seven minutes outside of the county seat of Newton. As of the 2024–25 school year, the high school had an enrollment of 733 students and 71.5 classroom teachers (on an FTE basis), for a student–teacher ratio of 10.3:1.

== History ==
In the wake of protests by parents about the exposure of students to electromagnetic fields and threats by the district to close the school, PSE&G agreed in 2011 to contribute $950,000 towards a construction project that would relocate a playground that had been situated near high voltage lines that pass by the school.

The district had been classified by the New Jersey Department of Education as being in District Factor Group "GH", the third-highest of eight groupings. District Factor Groups organize districts statewide to allow comparison by common socioeconomic characteristics of the local districts. From lowest socioeconomic status to highest, the categories are A, B, CD, DE, FG, GH, I and J.

== Awards and recognition ==
Fredon School was awarded the National Blue Ribbon Award for Academic Excellence in November 2001, the highest level of recognition granted to an American school.

== Schools ==
Fredon Township School had an enrollment of 203 students in grades PreK–6 as of the 2020–21 school year.

== Administration ==
Core members of the district's administration are:

- Kelly Hart, superintendent
- Erin Siipola, business administrator and board secretary

== Board of education ==
The district's board of education, comprised of five members, sets policy and oversees the fiscal and educational operation of the district through its administration. As a Type II school district, the board's trustees are elected directly by voters to serve three-year terms of office on a staggered basis, with either one or two seats up for election each year held in April. The board appoints a superintendent to oversee the district's day-to-day operations and a business administrator to supervise the business functions of the district.

Of the nearly 600 school districts statewide, Fredon is one of 12 districts with school elections in April, in which voters also decide on passage of the annual school budget. After a change in state law in 2012, the district moved its school elections from April to November. In both 2018 and 2019, the township council voted to move elections back to April, but each time the school board voted to keep the elections in November. In November 2020, voters approved a referendum question that had been placed on the ballot by citizen initiative and approved by a 3-1 margin the change to shift elections back to April.
