= Smiths Hill =

Hill in New Jersey, United States

Highest point
- Elevation: 863 ft (263 m) NGVD 29
- Coordinates: 41°04′57″N 74°44′49″W

Geography
- Location: Sussex County, New Jersey, U.S.
- Topo map: USGS Newton East

Climbing
- Easiest route: Hiking

Smiths Hill is a hill in Sussex County, New Jersey. The summit rises to 863 feet (263 m), and is located in Hampton Township, north of Newton. It is located in the Kittatinny Valley of the Appalachian Mountains.
