= Coursen House =

Mansion in Fredon Township, New Jersey, US

Coordinates: 41.035098°N 74.816653°W

The Coursen House is a historic mansion in Fredon Township, New Jersey. Built in 1805 by the Coursen Family, the building is now owned by the town.

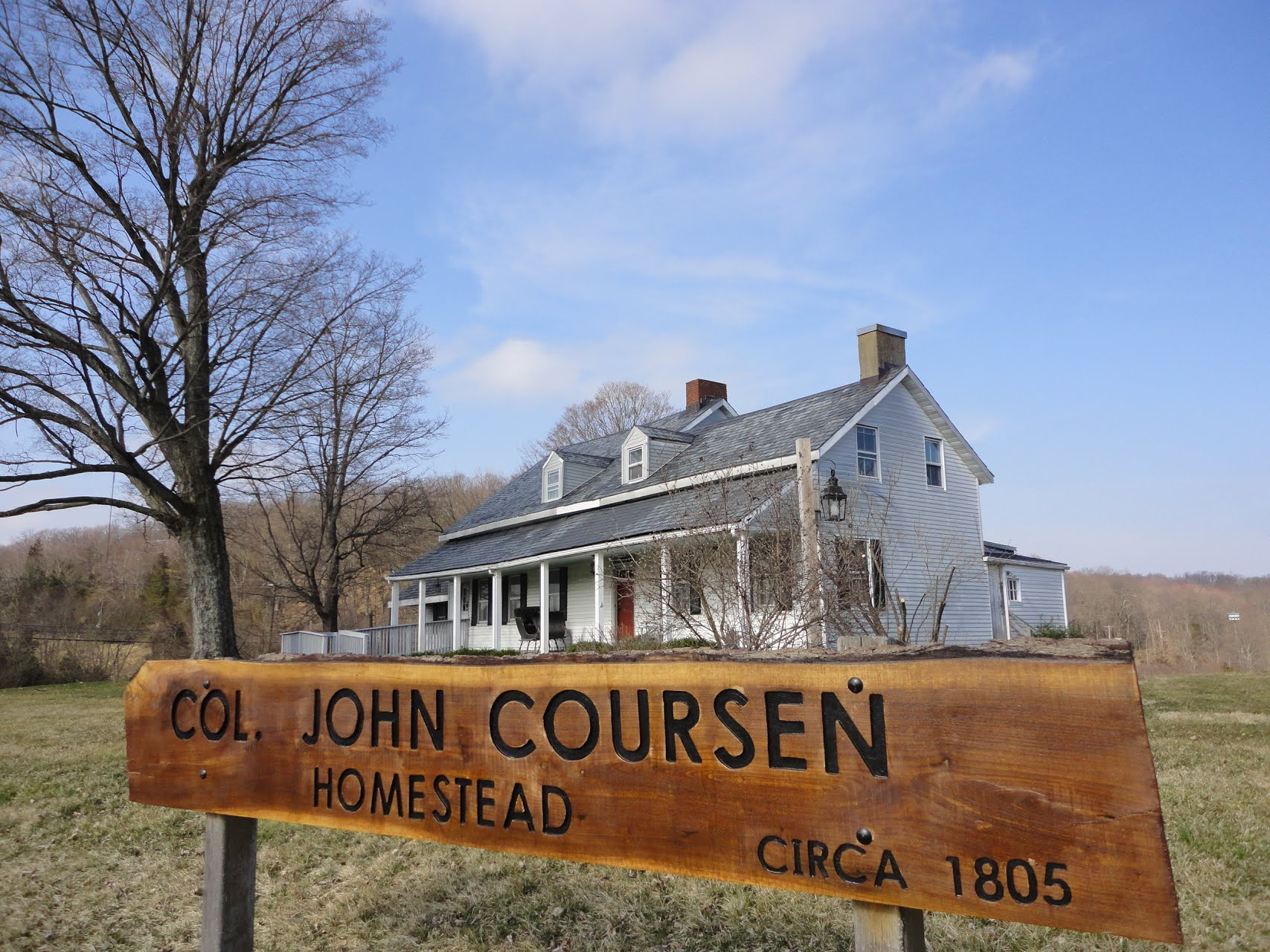
John Coursen House

== History ==
In the mid-18th century, two descendants of New Amsterdam Dutch families, Johannes Coursen, and his wife, Gertrude Van Tuyle, arrived in the Fredon area.

In 1763, Johannes Coursen purchased over 800 acres in the township. A log cabin was most likely the first building on the property. The Coursen mansion was built in 1805. It contained four rooms on the first floor with a chimney across the corner of two rooms. There were three bedrooms on the second floor. The kitchen, located on the southern end of the house, had a large bake oven to the right of the chimney.

When Johannes Coursen died, his property was divided between his two sons. The Paulinskill Mill Farm went to Jacob Coursen and the four-corners land to John Coursen.

In 1811, Colonel John's sons built and operated a blacksmith's shop, a tannery, a store, and later a tailor shop. His son, Isaac Coursen, established a post office and was the first postmaster. He added a first floor parlor and two more bedrooms upstairs as the family grew. After Isaac's death, the postmaster position was taken over by his son, William P. Coursen until 1881.

== Preservation ==
The Coursen House was purchased by Fredon Township as part of developing the next door Lodestar Park. Keepers of Coursens Corners, was formed in 2001 to begin the restoration. The objective of the restoration was to create a museum in the house.

== Sources ==
- Woodruff, Francis Eben. A Branch of the Woodruff Stock. Published by Printed at "The Jerseyman" office, 1902. Original from the University of Wisconsin at Madison. Digitized Apr 16, 2008
