= Strawberry Field (airport) =

Coordinates: 39.48917°N 74.72361°W

Strawberry Field (FAA LID: 89NJ) is a private-use airport located two miles north of Mays Landing in Atlantic County, New Jersey in the United States. It is owned by and operated as an air attack base by the New Jersey Forest Fire Service in its wildfire suppression and aerial firefighting efforts. It has a 2,200-foot (670 m) turf-sand runway designated 14/32 at an elevation of 45 feet (14 m) above mean sea level.

== See also ==
- Aeroflex–Andover Airport
- Coyle Field
