= Coyle Field =

Airport in Burlington County, New Jersey, US

Coordinates: 39.81262°N 74.42459°W

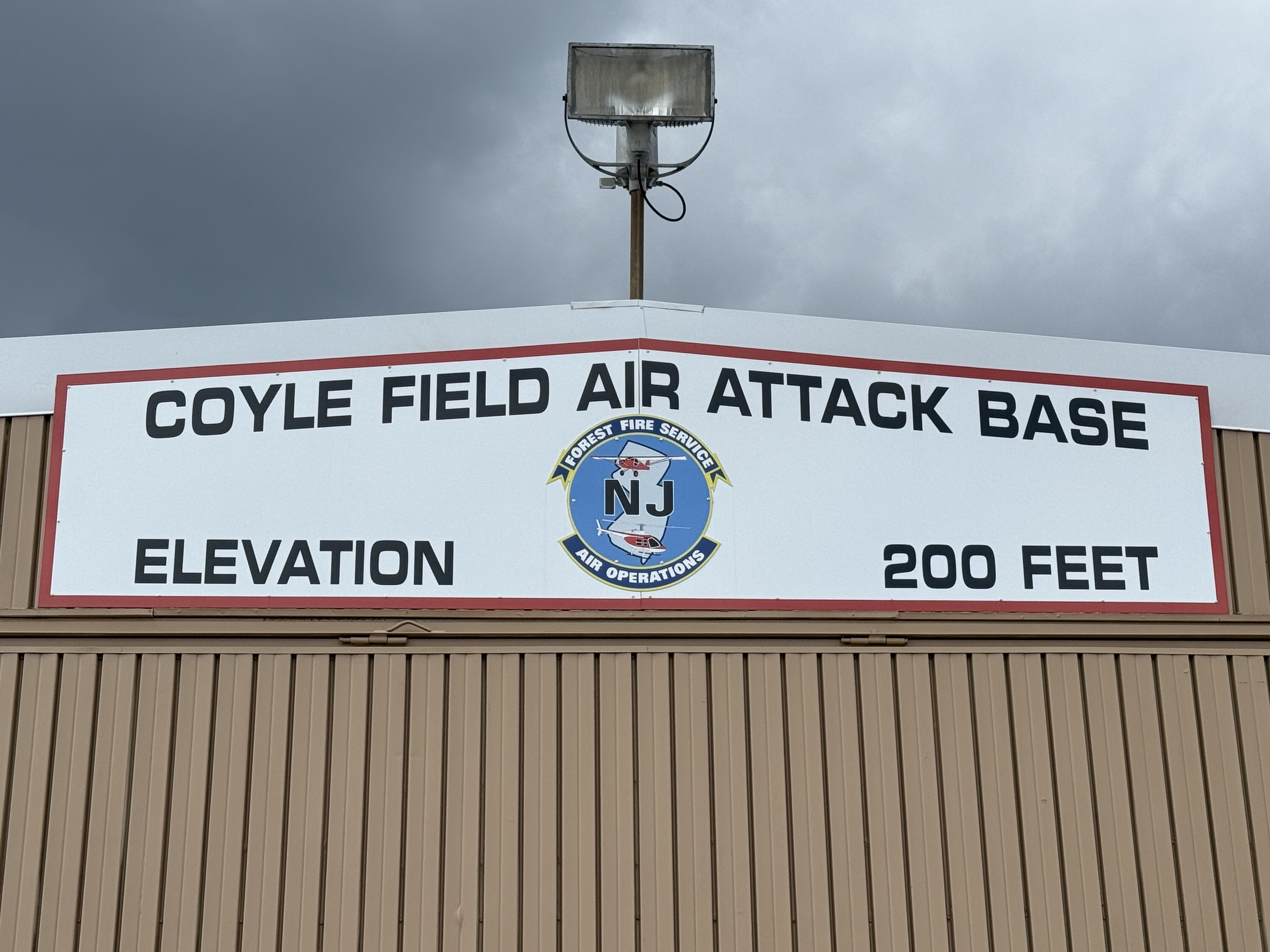
Sign over the main hangar

Coyle Field (FAA LID: NJ20) is a private-use airport established in 1938 and located five miles east of Chatsworth in Woodland Township, Burlington County, New Jersey, in the United States. It is owned by and operated as an air attack base by the New Jersey Forest Fire Service in its wildfire suppression and aerial firefighting efforts. Coyle Field is named after Leonidas Coyle, who served as state firewarden from 1923 to 1937 and who developed New Jersey's use of airplanes in wildfire observation and reconnaissance.

Coyle Field has three 1,800-foot (550 m) gravel runways designated north–south, northeast–southwest, and northwest–southeast at an elevation of 190 feet (58 m) above mean sea level.

== See also ==
- Aeroflex–Andover Airport
- Strawberry Field (airport)
