= Aeroflex–Andover Airport =

Airport in Sussex County, New Jersey, United States

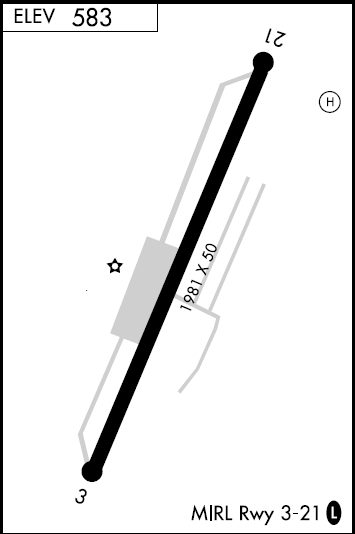
- IATA: none; ICAO: none; FAA LID: 12N

Summary
- Airport type: Public use
- Owner: New Jersey Forest Fire Service
- Operator: John T. Flyntz
- Serves: Andover, New Jersey
- Location: Sussex County, New Jersey
- Elevation AMSL: 583 ft (178 m)
- Coordinates: 41.0083°N 74.7383°W
- Website: New Jersey State Forest Fire Service

Map
- Interactive map of Aeroflex–Andover Airport

Runways
Direction	Length		Surface
Direction	ft	m	Surface
3/21	1,981	604	Asphalt

Statistics (2010)
- Aircraft operations: 24,826
- Based aircraft: 48
- Source: Federal Aviation Administration

Aeroflex–Andover Airport (FAA LID: 12N) is a public-use airport located two nautical miles (3.704 km) north of Andover within Kittatinny Valley State Park in Sussex County, New Jersey, United States. The airport is publicly owned by the New Jersey Forest Fire Service and used as a base for aerial wildfire suppression.

== Facilities and aircraft ==
Aeroflex–Andover Airport covers an area of 12 acres (4.9 ha) at an elevation of 583 feet (178 m) above mean sea level. It has one runway designated 03/21 with an asphalt surface measuring 1,981 by 50 feet (604 x 15 m).

For the 12-month period ending January 1, 2010, the airport had 24,826 aircraft operations, an average of 68 per day: 100% general aviation. At that time there were 48 aircraft based at this airport: 98% single-engine and 2% helicopter.

=== Runway issues ===
Pilots consider landing on the short runway challenging, particularly for those who do not regularly use the airport. With large lakes on either end, it has been likened to an aircraft carrier. While Flying editor Stephen Pope, who lives in northern New Jersey, considers that reputation to be exaggerated, "it wouldn't be my first choice if I had to divert with my family on board."

External videos
- Northerly approach to airport seen from cockpit

Pope was referring to a recent incident where landing planes had come in too fast and gone off the runway into the water. In that July 5, 2019, accident, the pilot of a Cessna C172 who had left Harrisburg, Pennsylvania, with his wife and children aboard was forced to divert when Morristown Municipal Airport, his intended destination, was temporarily closed so that President Donald Trump and his wife could go to the resort he owns in nearby Bedminster and play golf. The pilot and his family were rescued by a nearby fisherman before their plane could sink in 18–24 feet (5.5–7.3 m) of water in 119-acre (48 ha) Lake Aeroflex north of the runway. None of them were injured.

== See also ==
- Coyle Field
- Strawberry Field (airport)
