= Fredon Township, New Jersey =

Township in Sussex County, New Jersey, US

- Township
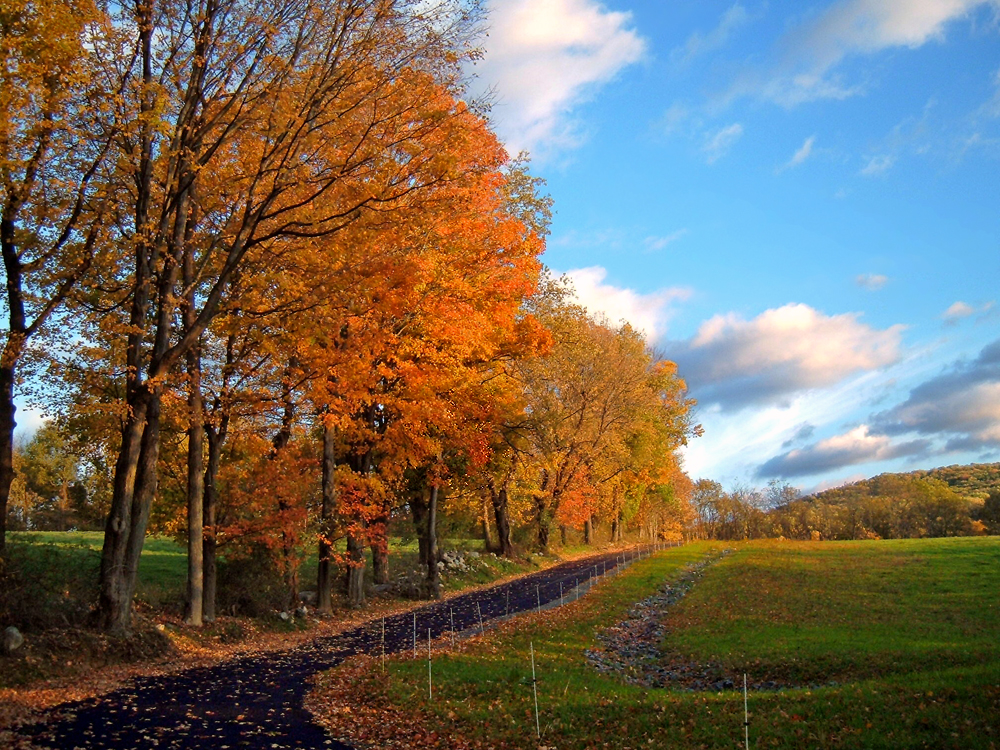
- Autumn landscape

- Seal

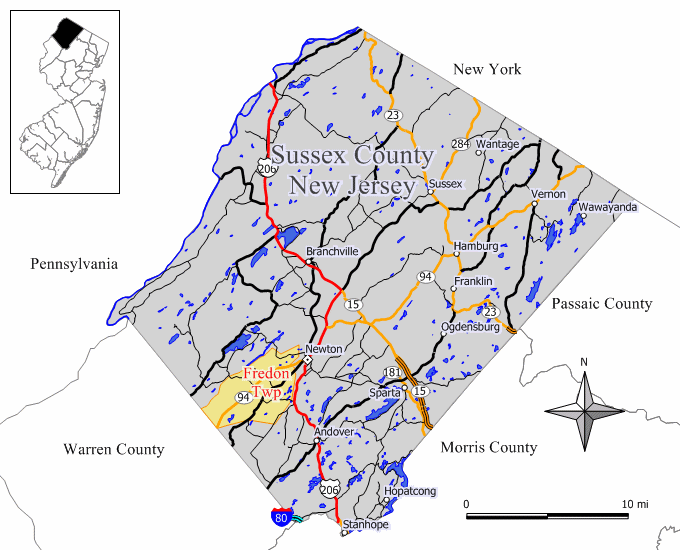
- Map of Fredon Township in Sussex County. Inset: Location of Sussex County highlighted in the State of New Jersey.

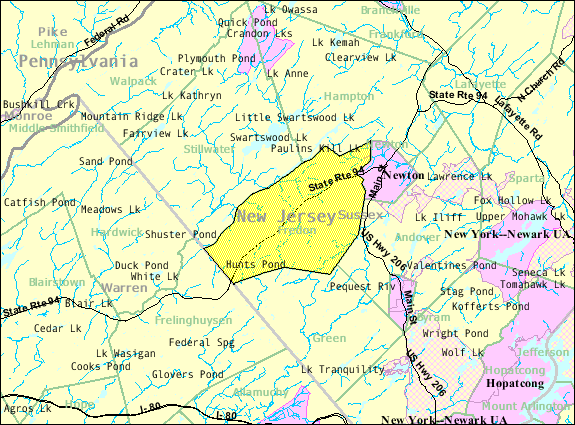
- Census Bureau map of Fredon Township, New Jersey.

- Location in Sussex County Location in New Jersey Location in the United States
- Coordinates: 41.024675°N 74.818224°W
- Country: United States
- State: New Jersey
- County: Sussex
- Incorporated: February 24, 1904

Government
  - Type: Township
  - Body: Township Committee
  - Mayor: Chris Nichols (R, term ends December 31, 2026)
  - Municipal clerk: Suzanne Boland

Area
  - Total: 17.92 sq mi (46.40 km^{2})
  - Land: 17.64 sq mi (45.69 km^{2})
  - Water: 0.27 sq mi (0.71 km^{2}) 1.53%
  - Rank: 160th of 565 in state 14th of 24 in county
- Elevation: 830 ft (250 m)

Population (2020)
  - Total: 3,235
  - Estimate (2023): 3,293
  - Rank: 440th of 565 in state 17th of 24 in county
  - Density: 183.4/sq mi (70.8/km^{2})
  - Rank: 511th of 565 in state 17th of 24 in county
- Time zone: UTC−05:00 (Eastern (EST))
  - Summer (DST): UTC−04:00 (Eastern (EDT))
- ZIP Code: 07860 – Newton
- Area code: 973
- FIPS code: 3403725140
- GNIS feature ID: 0882268
- Website: www.fredonnj.gov

Fredon Township (/ˈfriːdən/ FREE-dən) is a township in Sussex County, in the U.S. state of New Jersey. As of the 2020 United States census, the township's population was 3,235, a decrease of 202 (−5.9%) from the 2010 census count of 3,437, which in turn reflected an increase of 577 (+20.2%) from the 2,860 counted in the 2000 census.

In 1800, Isaac V. Coursen named the Stillwater Township area "Coursen's Corners" after establishing a post office in his store, the Coursen House, but changed the name to Fredon Village before his death in 1855. Stillwater Township's Bicentennial Committee obtained information from the Postmaster General which "states that 'Fredon' is derived from the German word "fredonia," meaning place of freedom." Fredon Township was incorporated on February 24, 1904, from portions of Andover Township, Green Township, Hampton Township and Stillwater Township.

== Geography ==
According to the United States Census Bureau, the township had a total area of 17.92 square miles (46.40 km^{2}), including 17.64 square miles (45.69 km^{2}) of land and 0.28 square miles (0.71 km^{2}) of water (1.53%).

Unincorporated communities, localities and place names located partially or completely within the township include Hunts Pond, Muckshaw Pond and Stillwater.

Fredon Township borders the municipalities of Andover Township, Green Township, Hampton Township, Newton and Stillwater Township in Sussex County; and Frelinghuysen Township in Warren County

The New York, Susquehanna and Western Railway operated from 1872 until 1962 through the Paulinskill Valley, which runs along the border with Hampton and Stillwater Townships to the township's northwest, and was used to transport agricultural products to New York City. Today the right-of-way has been developed into the Paulinskill Valley Trail, a non-motorized multi-use trail that is part of the Kittatinny Valley State Park.

== Demographics ==
Historical population
Census	Pop.	Note	%±
1870	150		—
1910	457		—
1920	269		−41.1%
1930	412		53.2%
1940	478		16.0%
1950	584		22.2%
1960	804		37.7%
1970	1,372		70.6%
1980	2,281		66.3%
1990	2,763		21.1%
2000	2,860		3.5%
2010	3,437		20.2%
2020	3,235		−5.9%
2023 (est.)	3,293		1.8%
Population sources: 1870 1910–1920; 1910 1910–1930; 1940–2000 2000; 2010 2020

=== 2010 census ===
The 2010 United States census counted 3,437 people, 1,207 households, and 973 families in the township. The population density was 194.0 per square mile (74.9/km^{2}). There were 1,289 housing units at an average density of 72.7 per square mile (28.1/km^{2}). The racial makeup was 96.04% (3,301) White, 0.52% (18) Black or African American, 0.12% (4) Native American, 1.69% (58) Asian, 0.00% (0) Pacific Islander, 0.61% (21) from other races, and 1.02% (35) from two or more races. Hispanic or Latino of any race were 3.70% (127) of the population.

Of the 1,207 households, 35.6% had children under the age of 18; 71.9% were married couples living together; 6.3% had a female householder with no husband present and 19.4% were non-families. Of all households, 15.8% were made up of individuals and 7.0% had someone living alone who was 65 years of age or older. The average household size was 2.84 and the average family size was 3.18.

25.7% of the population were under the age of 18, 6.0% from 18 to 24, 21.0% from 25 to 44, 33.6% from 45 to 64, and 13.6% who were 65 years of age or older. The median age was 43.3 years. For every 100 females, the population had 99.6 males. For every 100 females ages 18 and older there were 97.1 males.

The Census Bureau's 2006–2010 American Community Survey showed that (in 2010 inflation-adjusted dollars) median household income was $104,074 (with a margin of error of +/− $9,084) and the median family income was $110,000 (+/− $10,332). Males had a median income of $78,000 (+/− $7,722) versus $42,981 (+/− $6,474) for females. The per capita income for the borough was $40,761 (+/− $4,361). About none of families and 1.9% of the population were below the poverty line, including none of those under age 18 and 6.3% of those age 65 or over.

=== 2000 census ===
As of the 2000 United States census there were 2,860 people, 982 households, and 818 families residing in the township. The population density was 161.1 inhabitants per square mile (62.2/km^{2}). There were 1,019 housing units at an average density of 57.4 per square mile (22.2/km^{2}). The racial makeup of the township was 97.17% White, 0.52% African American, 0.24% Native American, 0.84% Asian, 0.56% from other races, and 0.66% from two or more races. Hispanic or Latino of any race were 2.17% of the population.

There were 982 households, out of which 39.0% had children under the age of 18 living with them, 75.5% were married couples living together, 6.3% had a female householder with no husband present, and 16.7% were non-families. 13.3% of all households were made up of individuals, and 5.6% had someone living alone who was 65 years of age or older. The average household size was 2.89 and the average family size was 3.18.

In the township the population was spread out, with 26.6% under the age of 18, 5.2% from 18 to 24, 29.3% from 25 to 44, 29.5% from 45 to 64, and 9.3% who were 65 years of age or older. The median age was 39 years. For every 100 females, there were 95.8 males. For every 100 females age 18 and over, there were 95.4 males.

The median income for a household in the township was $75,710, and the median income for a family was $84,038. Males had a median income of $52,396 versus $34,205 for females. The per capita income for the township was $31,430. About 0.7% of families and 2.2% of the population were below the poverty line, including 2.9% of those under age 18 and 3.4% of those age 65 or over.

== Government ==
=== Local government ===
Fredon Township is governed under the Township form of New Jersey municipal government, one of 141 municipalities (of the 564) statewide that use this form, the second-most commonly used form of government in the state. The Township Committee is comprised of five members, who are elected directly by the voters at-large in partisan elections to serve three-year terms of office on a staggered basis, with either one or two seats coming up for election each year as part of the November general election in a three-year cycle. At an annual reorganization meeting held during the first week of January, the Township Committee selects one of its members to serve as Mayor and another as Deputy Mayor.

As of 2024, members of the Fredon Township Committee are Mayor Glenn Dietz (R, term on township committee ends December 31, 2026; term as mayor ends 2024), Deputy Mayor Christopher Nichols (R, 2026), Erin Corcella (R, 2024), Carl Lazzaro (R, 2025) and George Plock (R, 2024).

In December 2015, the Township Committee appointed Keith Smith to fill the seat expiring in December 2016 that had been held by former mayor Carl F. Lazzaro until he resigned to run for and win a seat as a Sussex County Freeholder; Smith will serve on an interim basis until the November 2016 general election, when voters will select a candidate to serve the balance of the term of office.

=== Federal, state, and county representation ===
Fredon Township is located in the 7th Congressional District and is part of New Jersey's 24th state legislative district.

For the 119th United States Congress, New Jersey's 7th congressional district is represented by Thomas Kean Jr. (R, Westfield). New Jersey is represented in the United States Senate by Democrats Cory Booker (Newark, term ends 2027) and Andy Kim (Moorestown, term ends 2031).

For the 2026–2027 session, the 24th legislative district of the New Jersey Legislature is represented in the State Senate by Parker Space (R, Wantage Township) and in the General Assembly by Dawn Fantasia (R, Franklin) and Mike Inganamort (R, Chester Township).

Sussex County is governed by a Board of County Commissioners whose five members are elected at-large in partisan elections on a staggered basis, with either one or two seats coming up for election each year. At an annual reorganization meeting held in the beginning of January, the board selects a Commissioner Director and Deputy Director from among its members, with day-to-day supervision of the operation of the county delegated to a County Administrator. As of 2025, Sussex County's Commissioners are Director Jill Space (R, Wantage Township, 2025), Deputy Director Chris Carney (R, Frankford Township, 2027), Jack DeGroot (R, Sussex, 2026), William Hayden (I, Branchville, 2025) and Alan Henderson (R, Lafayette Township, 2027).

Constitutional officers elected on a countywide basis are Clerk Jeffrey M. Parrott (R, Wantage Township, 2026), Sheriff Michael F. Strada (R, Hampton Township, 2025) and Surrogate Gary R. Chiusano (R, Frankford Township, 2028).

=== Politics ===
As of March 2011, there were a total of 2,394 registered voters in Fredon Township, of which 316 (13.2% vs. 16.5% countywide) were registered as Democrats, 1,136 (47.5% vs. 39.3%) were registered as Republicans and 941 (39.3% vs. 44.1%) were registered as Unaffiliated. There was one voter registered to another party. Among the township's 2010 Census population, 69.7% (vs. 65.8% in Sussex County) were registered to vote, including 93.7% of those ages 18 and over (vs. 86.5% countywide).

Gubernatorial election results for Fredon Township
Year	Republican		Democratic		Third party(ies)	
Year	No.	%	No.	%	No.	%
2025	1,083	63.37%	615	35.99%	11	0.64%
2021	962	69.06%	419	30.08%	12	0.86%
2017	714	63.13%	361	31.92%	56	4.95%
2013	864	76.94%	221	19.68%	38	3.38%
2009	911	67.83%	297	22.11%	135	10.05%
2005	767	66.41%	342	29.61%	46	3.98%

In the 2012 presidential election, Republican Mitt Romney received 1,237 votes (65.6% vs. 59.4% countywide), ahead of Democrat Barack Obama with 610 votes (32.3% vs. 38.2%) and other candidates with 33 votes (1.7% vs. 2.1%), among the 1,887 ballots cast by the township's 2,478 registered voters, for a turnout of 76.2% (vs. 68.3% in Sussex County). In the 2008 presidential election, Republican John McCain received 1,269 votes (64.4% vs. 59.2% countywide), ahead of Democrat Barack Obama with 654 votes (33.2% vs. 38.7%) and other candidates with 40 votes (2.0% vs. 1.5%), among the 1,970 ballots cast by the township's 2,405 registered voters, for a turnout of 81.9% (vs. 76.9% in Sussex County). In the 2004 presidential election, Republican George W. Bush received 1,202 votes (67.5% vs. 63.9% countywide), ahead of Democrat John Kerry with 553 votes (31.1% vs. 34.4%) and other candidates with 21 votes (1.2% vs. 1.3%), among the 1,780 ballots cast by the township's 2,150 registered voters, for a turnout of 82.8% (vs. 77.7% in the whole county).

United States presidential election results for Fredon Township 2024 2020 2016 2012 2008 2004
Year	Republican		Democratic		Third party(ies)	
Year	No.	%	No.	%	No.	%
2024	1,357	63.77%	736	34.59%	35	1.64%
2020	1,364	62.14%	789	35.95%	42	1.91%
2016	1,267	65.55%	580	30.01%	86	4.45%
2012	1,237	65.80%	610	32.45%	33	1.76%
2008	1,269	64.65%	654	33.32%	40	2.04%
2004	1,202	67.68%	553	31.14%	21	1.18%

In the 2013 gubernatorial election, Republican Chris Christie received 76.9% of the vote (864 cast), ahead of Democrat Barbara Buono with 19.7% (221 votes), and other candidates with 3.4% (38 votes), among the 1,138 ballots cast by the township's 2,464 registered voters (15 ballots were spoiled), for a turnout of 46.2%. In the 2009 gubernatorial election, Republican Chris Christie received 911 votes (67.7% vs. 63.3% countywide), ahead of Democrat Jon Corzine with 297 votes (22.1% vs. 25.7%), Independent Chris Daggett with 120 votes (8.9% vs. 9.1%) and other candidates with 15 votes (1.1% vs. 1.3%), among the 1,346 ballots cast by the township's 2,370 registered voters, yielding a 56.8% turnout (vs. 52.3% in the county).

United States Senate election results for Fredon Township1
Year	Republican		Democratic		Third party(ies)	
Year	No.	%	No.	%	No.	%
2024	1,343	64.51%	691	33.19%	48	2.31%
2018	1,080	65.81%	480	29.25%	81	4.94%
2012	1,207	65.85%	564	30.77%	62	3.38%
2006	771	63.88%	386	31.98%	50	4.14%

United States Senate election results for Fredon Township2
Year	Republican		Democratic		Third party(ies)	
Year	No.	%	No.	%	No.	%
2020	1,351	62.55%	771	35.69%	38	1.76%
2014	709	67.85%	307	29.38%	29	2.78%
2013	531	69.59%	226	29.62%	6	0.79%
2008	1,230	64.87%	597	31.49%	69	3.64%

== Education ==
Public school students are served by the Fredon Township School District for pre-kindergarten through sixth grade at Fredon Township School. As of the 2024–25 school year, the district, comprised of one school, had an enrollment of 204 students and 19.4 classroom teachers (on an FTE basis), for a student–teacher ratio of 10.5:1.

Students in seventh through twelfth grade for public school attend Kittatinny Regional High School located in Hampton Township, which serves students who reside in Fredon Township, Hampton Township, Sandyston Township, Stillwater Township and Walpack Township. The high school is located on a 96-acre (39 ha) campus in Hampton Township, about seven minutes outside of the county seat of Newton. As of the 2024–25 school year, the high school had an enrollment of 733 students and 71.5 classroom teachers (on an FTE basis), for a student–teacher ratio of 10.3:1.

== Transportation ==
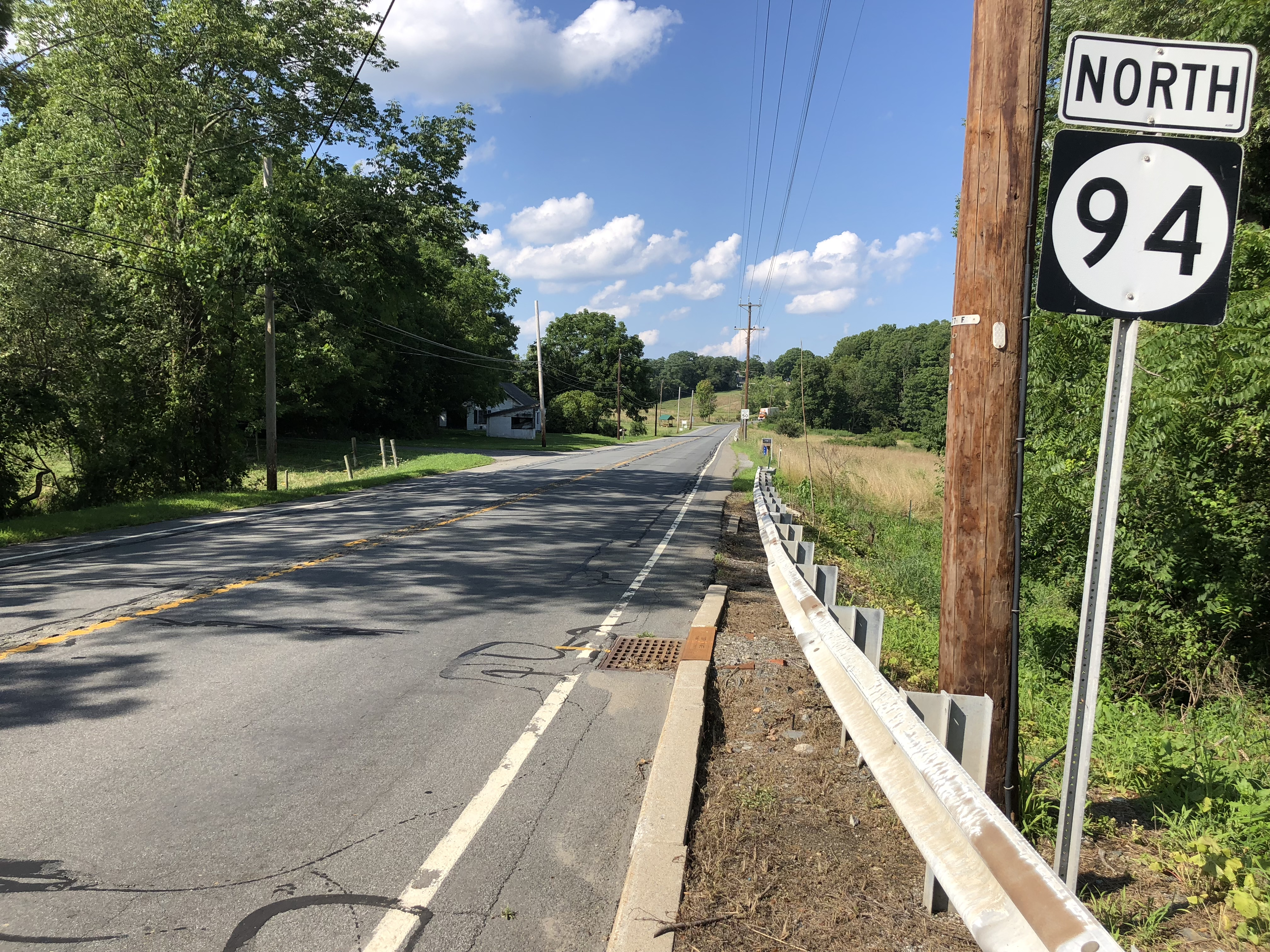
Route 94 northbound in Fredon Township

As of May 2010, the township had a total of 51.38 miles (82.69 km) of roadways, of which 31.94 miles (51.40 km) were maintained by the municipality, 13.13 miles (21.13 km) by Sussex County and 6.31 miles (10.15 km) by the New Jersey Department of Transportation.

New Jersey Route 94 is the main highway serving Fredon Township. County Route 519 is the only other significant road traversing the township.

== Notable people ==
People who were born in, residents of, or otherwise closely associated with Fredon Township include:

- Delicate Steve (stage name of Steve Marion), recording artist signed to David Byrne's Luaka Bop Records
- Uli Derickson (1944–2005), flight attendant best known for her role in helping protect 152 passengers and crew members during the June 14, 1985 hijacking of TWA Flight 847
- Charles Joseph Fletcher (1922–2011), inventor and the owner / CEO of Technology General Corporation who developed an early version of the hovercraft
