= New Jersey Forest Fire Service =

New Jersey Department of Environmental Protection agency

Operational area
- Country: United States
- State: New Jersey

Agency overview
- Established: 4 July 1906
- Annual calls: 1,063 FY2014
- Employees: 80 (full-time) approx. 2,000 (part-time)
- Annual budget: $8,775,000 FY2014
- Fire chief: William J. Donnelly (State Firewarden)

Facilities and equipment
- Divisions: 3
- Stations: 21 Fire Towers
- Tenders: 12
- Wildland: 109
- Bulldozers: 23
- Airplanes: 3
- Helicopters: 6

Website
- Official website

The New Jersey Forest Fire Service (NJFFS) is an agency within the New Jersey Department of Environmental Protection. Founded in 1906 with a focus on wildland fire suppression and fire protection, the Forest Fire Service is the largest firefighting department within the state of New Jersey in the United States with 85 full-time professional firefighting personnel (career civil service positions), and approximately 2,000 trained part-time on-call wildland firefighters throughout the state. Its mission is to protect "life and property, as well as the state's natural resources, from wildfire".

The New Jersey Forest Fire Service covers a primary response area of approximately 3.72 million acres comprising 77% of the state's land area and administered by three regional divisions. These divisions are divided into 29 sections, and further into 269 districts overseen by Section firewardens. All Firewardens are sworn law enforcement officers with authority pursuant to state law. These powers include broad authority to compel actions for fire prevention, to investigate a wildfire's cause (accidental or intentional), and exercise arrest and citation powers in matters involving criminal and civil liability. Firewardens are qualified incident commanders and direct operations of fire crews in suppression efforts. This primary response area includes the state's rural and suburban areas, as well as its public state parks and forests.

Because of the extent of suburban development in New Jersey, many of the state's residents live within a transition zone known as the wildland–urban interface which provides both increased challenges to fire suppression tactics and increased risk of fires causing damage to homes and property. In 2014, the New Jersey Forest Fire Service responded to 1,063 wildfire events that damaged 6,692 acres of wildlands. As a preventative measure, the service conducted controlled burns or prescribed burns on 15,326 acres statewide.

== History ==
=== Establishment and development ===
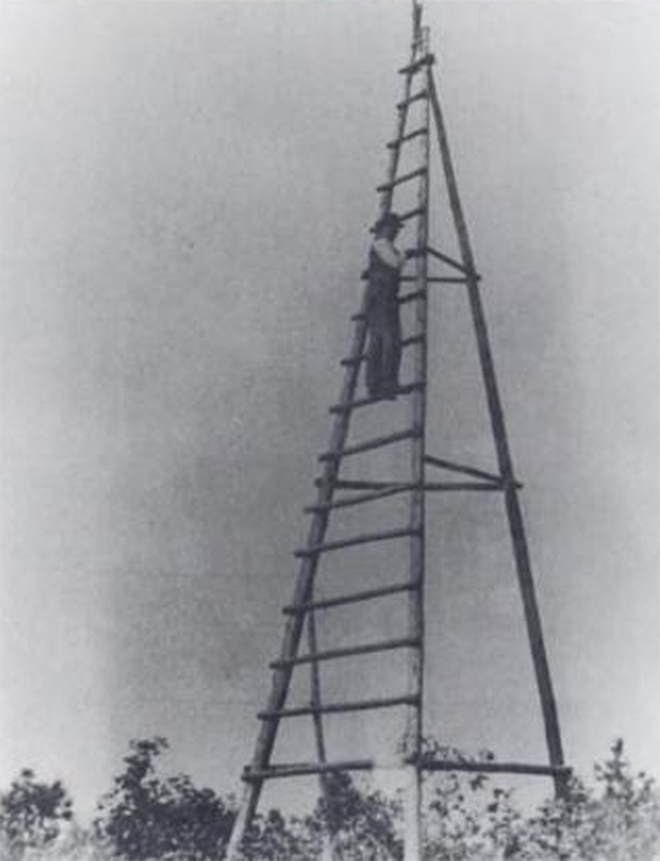
The New Jersey Forest Fire Service erected the "Four Mile Tower", a simple tripod of wooden poles, in 1910. It was replaced by the Lebanon Station.

Before the twentieth century, very little effort was made to control wildfires in New Jersey. According to reports of the state geologist, wildland fires in the Pine Barrens of South Jersey often burned 70,000 to 100,000 acres in any given year. In 1893, The New York Times reported "every year brings a reign of terror to the people living on and about the pine lands, and each year from $1,000,000 to $2,000,000 worth of property is destroyed by fire". In an 1896 report, state geologist John Conover Smock estimated New Jersey's loss in timber at a million dollars annually over the previous twenty years and that forest fire was also "a source of great danger to the cranberry plantations". Shortly after his appointment as chief of the Division of Forestry (later renamed the United States Forest Service), Gifford Pinchot (1865–1946), was commissioned to study forest fires and the best means for fighting them and to "show by actual measurements the loss to the State of New Jersey from forest fires". Pinchot submitted a report in which he recommended that the government make active efforts toward forest fire control to protect forests for the public benefit.

The state legislature created the New Jersey Forest Fire Service with an act signed into law by Governor Edward C. Stokes on April 18, 1906. The law went into effect on July 4, 1906. The Forest Park Reservation Commission, created the year before also at Pinchot's recommendation, regarded the creation of the Forest Fire Service as that body's most important accomplishment of the year. Theophilius P. Price, of Ocean County, was appointed the state's first firewarden. The state asked 81 rural townships to appoint township firewardens and provided them with shovels. Only three fires were reported in 1906, and the entire cost for fire fighting from July through November that year was $5.30 for one fire in Shamong.

By 1908, the Forest Fire Service comprised 99 township wardens, 120 district wardens—respectively paid $20 and $10 annually—and 81 unpaid railroad wardens to prevent fires along railroad right-of-ways. In 1911, the Weeks Act passed in response to a deadly and costly 1910 fire season (which included the Great Fire of 1910 and Baudette Fire of 1910) provided New Jersey sufficient funding to begin regular fire patrols to protect the watersheds of navigable streams. This was supplemented by the U.S. Postmaster General who ordered rural mail carriers to act as fire patrolmen in New Jersey and other states. Improvements in fire detection included the building of a system of fire observation towers, the first use of motor vehicles in fighting and patrolling efforts. Further expansion of fire protection was enabled by federal funds appropriated through the passage of the Clarke–McNary Act in 1924. From 1933 to 1942, during the Great Depression, the Civilian Conservation Corps (CCC) improved New Jersey's system of state parks and forest for recreation and built firebreaks and fireroads within these tracts for fire prevention.

The agency's capabilities have been enhanced through the use of aircraft in fire suppression. At first, the Forest Fire Service used aircraft to observe and identify fires, beginning in 1927 under the efforts of state firewarden Leonidas Coyle. However, aircraft would not be used actively to suppress fires through aerial bombardment until 1961 when "a Stearman biplane operating out of Coyle Field managed to drop 5,220 gallons of retardant on various fires, at 100 gallons a pop".

=== Notable fire incidents ===
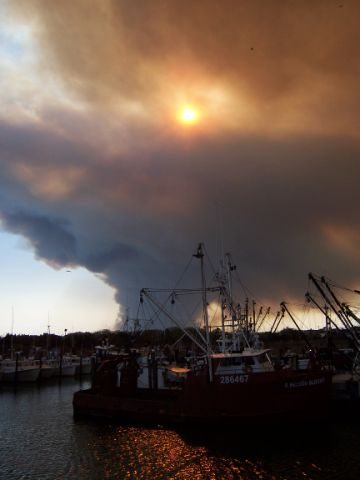
The smoke column from the Warren Grove Fire seen from several miles away in the harbor of Barnegat Light, New Jersey on May 15, 2007

Because of nature of the fuels and vegetations within the Pine Barrens, the region has experienced many of the state's significant-impact fires that burned a large number of acres and property. In late April 1922, a fire that burned 150,000 acres (61,000 ha) of Ocean and Monmouth counties also threatened the country estates of wealthy early twentieth-century American businessmen, John D. Rockefeller (near Lakewood), Arthur Brisbane (at Lane's Mills), and George J. Gould's estate known as "Georgian Court" (now the location of Georgian Court University). This fire caused approximately $3,000,000 of damage in 1922 U.S. dollars. In two days, on April 20 and 21 1963, a fast-growing wildfire destroyed 183,000 acres (74,000 ha) of land and consumed 186 homes and 197 buildings. A few residents were killed in the incident.

Several fires in the last two decades have been connected to accidents at United States military's Warren Grove Gunnery Range in Ocean County's Warren Grove. In April 1999, Nearly 12,000 acres (49 km^{2}) of forest, wetlands, cedar swamp and cranberry bogs burned after a Fairchild Republic A-10 Thunderbolt II from the 111th Fighter Wing plane dropped a "dummy" bomb more than a mile from its target. In June 2001, a 1,600 acres (6 km^{2}) forest fire occurred when an Air National Guard plane dropped a 25-pound practice bomb at the range. On May 15, 2007, flares dropped from an F-16 belonging to the 177th Fighter Wing set off a large wildfire that consumed more than 18,000 acres (73 km^{2}) of the Pinelands and forced the evacuation of hundreds of residents.

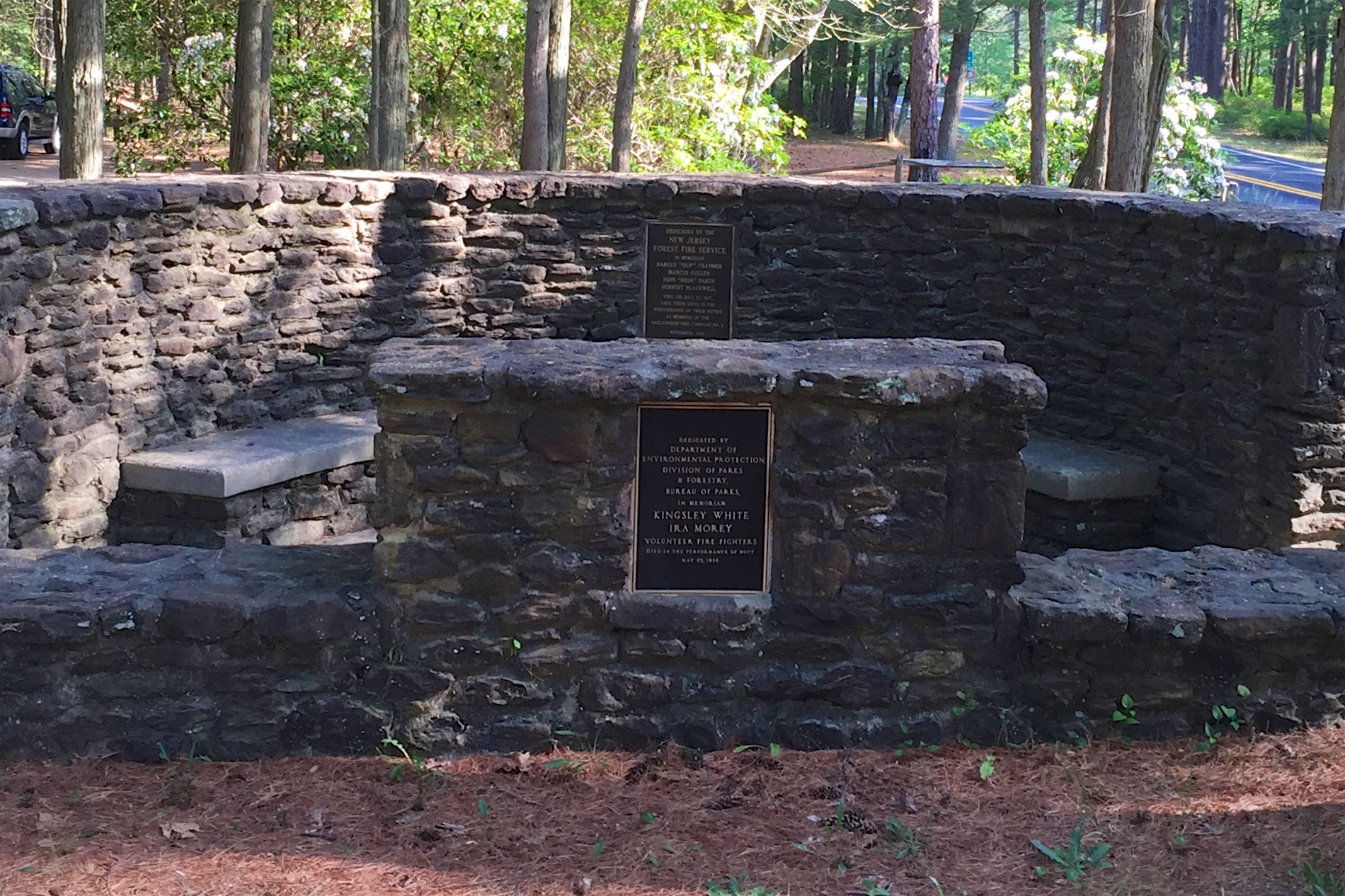
1936 / 1977 Wildland Firefighter Memorial at Bass River

Several wildfire incidents have resulted in firefighter fatalities. Over four days in late May 1936, several fires torched 18,000 acres (7,300 ha) of woods in the Pine Barrens, including a fire at Chatsworth in Burlington County. It is believed that shifting winds during a backfire operation took the lives of two fire wardens; and three men from the Civilian Conservation Corps' Company 225. On July 22, 1977, the Forest Fire Service and local fire departments responded to a fire burning in Bass River State Forest in Burlington County located north of Atlantic City, New Jersey. Extreme wind shifts and fire behavior caused units to be pulled out from the fire, but flames engulfed Engine Number 731, a specially equipped 10-wheel tank truck from the Eagleswood Fire Company resulting in the deaths of its four firemen, including a chief and assistant chief. A memorial to the fallen firefighters from the 1936 and 1977 Bass River Fires is located in the state forest along Greenbush Road in Bass River Township, New Jersey.

== Organization ==
=== Mission ===
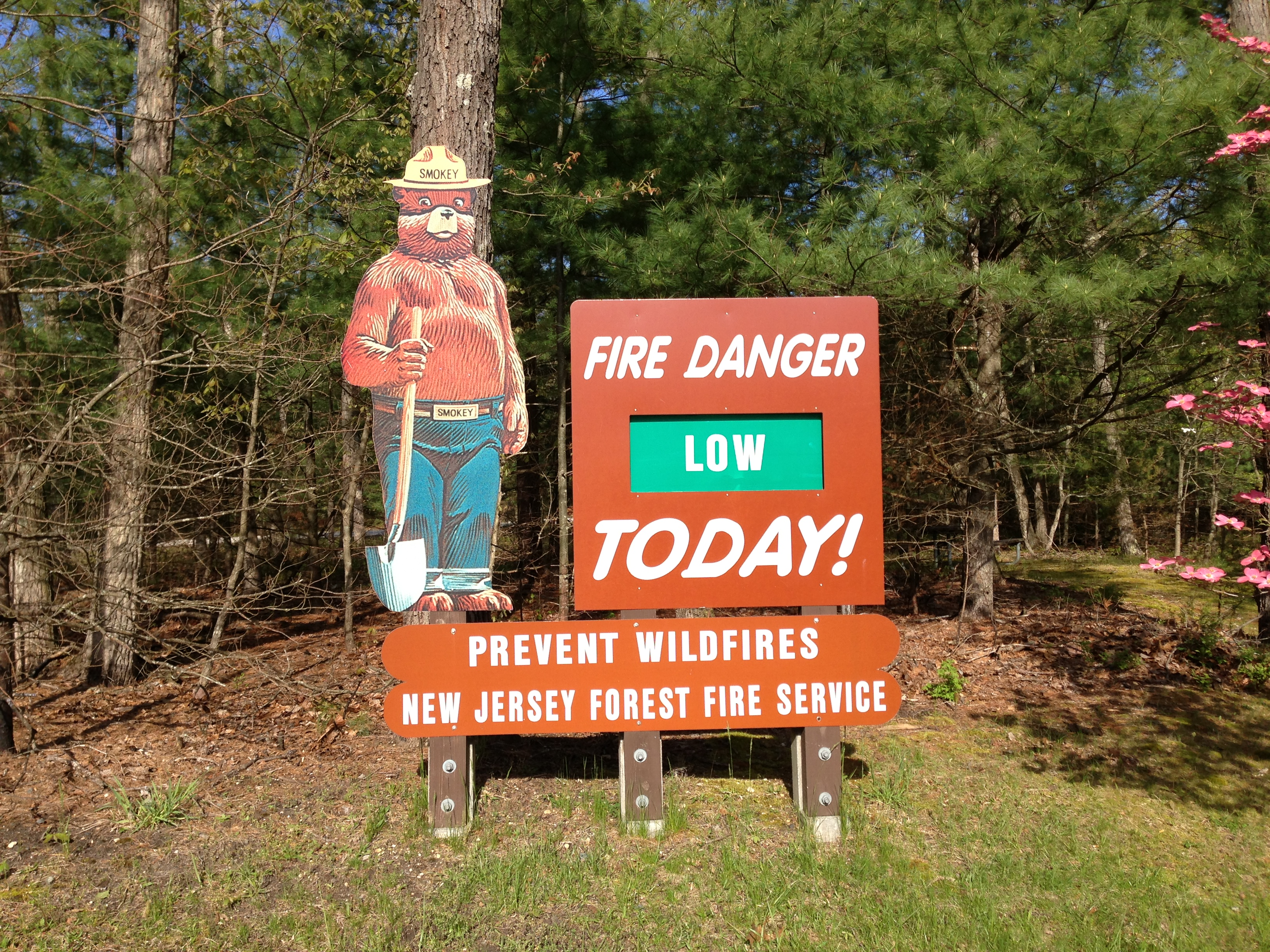
Fire Danger Sign at Brendan T. Byrne State Forest headquarters

The New Jersey Forest Fire Service operates in accordance with its as mission defined in the General Forest Fire Act, and the succeeding Forest Fire Prevention and Control Act which were codified in Title 13, Section 9, of the New Jersey Statutes. It is the state government's policy:

... to prevent, control and manage wildfires on or threatening the forest or Wildland of New Jersey in order to preserve forests and other natural resources; to enhance the growth and maintenance of forests; to protect recreational, residential, wildlife, plant life, watershed, airshed, and other values; to promote the stability of forest using industries; and to prevent loss of life, bodily injury and damage to property from wildfire and conflagrations.

The law defines the word "forest" broadly, construing wildlands that are "forest, bushland, grassland, salt marsh, and any combination thereof." According to the agency's administrative boundaries map, the Forest Fire Service is the primary response fire service agency for wildfires in approximately 77% of the state's land area—3,719,638 acres (1,505,284 ha). The remaining portion of the state, 1.1 million acres, comprises urban and densely populated suburban areas in which it is the agency of secondary response—called to assist local firefighting services. The Forest Fire Service aims to limit wildfires to under 2,000 events annually and control any property burned "to less than one half of one percent (.5%) of the 3.15 million acres protected, or 15,750 acres."

=== Administration ===
The New Jersey Forest Fire Service is an agency within the state's Department of Environmental Protection (NJDEP). The Forest Fire Service's administrative offices are located in the 5 Station Plaza building, which houses some NJDEP offices at 501 East State Street in Trenton located one block north of New Jersey Transit's Trenton Transit Center. The service has offices for each of its three divisions at Andover, New Lisbon, and Mays Landing.

Pursuant to N.J.S.A 13:9-13, the New Jersey Forest Fire Service is led by a "State Firewarden" serving under the NJDEP Commissioner who "shall administer and supervise the Forest Fire Service, cooperating agencies, and such laws as shall deal with the protection of forests, from wildfire". The current state firewarden is William J. Donnelly. Fifteen individuals have occupied the State Firewarden position since the establishment of the Forest Fire Service in 1906.

=== Regional divisions and districts ===
The Forest Fire Service operates over three regional divisions, each administered by a division firewarden. Division A covers all of northern New Jersey north of the Raritan River. Division B covers central New Jersey south of the Raritan River but north of the Mullica River. Division C covers southern New Jersey south of the Mullica River. Each Division is partitioned into sections of approximately 100,000 acres (40,000 ha). There are 29 sections throughout the state. Each section is further divided into districts of 15,000 acres (6,100 ha) to 20,000 acres (8,100 ha) for a total of 269 districts statewide. Each section is administered by full-time section forest firewarden and district within those sections is overseen by a part-time district firewarden. Firewardens obtain qualifications as incident commanders for the roles and responsibilities as defined under the National Incident Management System as a part of the Incident Command System. They are also experienced firefighters who have additional qualifications as a crew boss or training in for specialized crew work and tactics.

Division	Station Location	Air Operations	Counties covered	Primary Response Acres	Secondary Response Acres	Total Acres
Division A	240 Main Street (U.S. Route 206); Andover Borough	Aeroflex–Andover Airport; Kittatinny Valley State Park; Andover Township	Bergen, Essex, Hunterdon, Mercer (part), (Note: Division A includes rural Hopewell Township in Mercer County. The remaining land area of Mercer County is covered by Division B.) Middlesex (part), (Note: Division A covers the land area of Middlesex County to the north of the Raritan River. The remaining land area of Middlesex County is covered by Division B.) Morris, Passaic, Somerset, Sussex, Union, Warren	1,530,526 acres (619,382 ha)	423,827 acres (171,517 ha)	1,954,353 acres (790,899 ha)
Division B	103 Shinns Road; Brendan T. Byrne State Forest; New Lisbon (Woodland Township)	Coyle Field; Woodland Township	Burlington, Mercer (part), Middlesex (part), Monmouth, Ocean	1,061,781 acres (429,688 ha)	381,657 acres (154,451 ha)	1,443,438 acres (584,139 ha)
Division C	5555 Atlantic Avenue (U.S. Route 40); Mays Landing	Strawberry Field; Mays Landing	Atlantic, Camden, Cape May, Cumberland, Gloucester, Salem	1,127,331 acres (456,215 ha)	310,038 acres (125,468 ha)	1,437,369 acres (581,683 ha)

== Services ==
=== Wildfire suppression and prevention ===
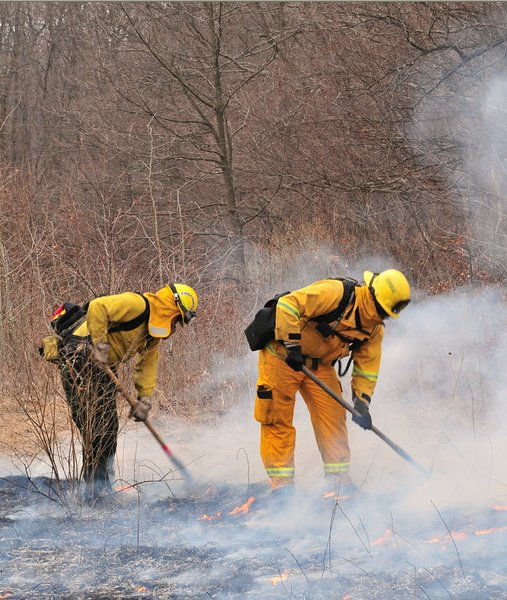
A fireline handcrew suppressing a fire in northern New Jersey

According to the state budget for fiscal year 2016, roughly 43% of New Jersey's land is classified as forested. New Jersey includes varied topography including coastal plains, piedmont, and the mountainous terrain of the Highlands region and the state's highest elevations along Kittatinny Mountain, an Appalachian ridge. Rural southern New Jersey is dominated by the Pine Barrens, a forest ecoregion with vegetation that fuels volatile wildfires. However, New Jersey has experienced a proliferation of residential subdivision and developments in its forested areas. Many of these rural and suburban areas offer a challenging combination of homes, residential communities, and other structures located within the wildland areas. The agency states that a majority of this development has been planned and built without due consideration for forest fire protection. This mix of wild and developed areas is called the wildland–urban interface. The New Jersey Forest Fire Service works closely with residents and communities to educate on matters of wildfire prevention and steps that can be taken to protect property from wildfire risk.

In 2014, the most recent year for which figures are available, the New Jersey Forest Fire Service responded to 1,063 wildfire events that destroyed 6,692 acres. The 2016 budget appropriates $8,775,000 for "Forest Resource Management". This line-item includes Forest Fire Service activities and expenditures as well as those of other forestry programs overseen by the Division of Parks and Forestry. Of this figure, an enumerated $2,559,000 is appropriated specifically for "fire fighting costs".

As a hazard reduction tactic to lessen the potential or risk for future wildfire in an area, the Forest Fire Service conducts controlled burns, also called prescribed burns. This tactic is employed to aid the prevention of wildfires, reduce the intensity of the fires, and also provide a foundation for safer, more effective fire suppression and protection operations. The agency aims to conduct prescribed burns on up to 20,000 acres of wildland each year in the late autumn and winter months between October 1 and March 31. In 2014, the agency conducted controlled burns or prescribed burns on 15,326 acres statewide.

The New Jersey Forest Fire Service estimates (and anticipates) an average of 1,400 to 1,500 wildland fires that occur each year destroying approximately 7,000 acres within the state. Of these fires, 99% are either intentionally or accidentally caused by humans. Unlike wildfires in the Western United States which are more frequently caused by lightning strikes, only an estimated one percent of wildfires in New Jersey are caused by natural events such as lightning. Because of New Jersey's temperate climate, lightning storms or thunderstorms are typically accompanied by precipitation and as a result few fires are caused or able to spread. Human causes include: 17.8% caused by arson, 17.4% by children playing with matches or intentionally setting fires, 13.4% from regular equipment use (cars, power lines, lawn mowers, tractors), 7.5% by railroads (hot breaks, exhaust particles, equipment failure), 7% for smokers improperly discarding cigarettes, 7% from recreational campfires, and 5.7% from the illegal burning of debris. The remaining 24% are of miscellaneous or undermined causes, including fireworks and incendiary devices. Comparatively, in 1895, a report of the state geologist indicated that 49% of fires were caused by locomotive engines and railroads, 41% were accidental, with the remainder being either arson or miscellaneous causes. However, because of innovations in fire-fighting technology and through an aggressive policy combining observation, identification, and containment of wildland fires, New Jersey experienced a reduction in the damage caused by incidents through the course of the twentieth century.

Decade	Reported fires	Acres burned	Acres/Fire Ratio (Note: This figure is derived through simple arithmetic. It is the quotient that results from by dividing the number of acres burned (the dividend) by the number of reported fires (the divisor).)	Notes
1902–1909	1,509	424,984	281	
1910–1919	7,085	713,215	101	
1920–1929	10,241	668,751	65.3	
1930–1939	13,841	586,176	42.35	
1940–1949	15,020	257,619	17.2	
1950–1959	12,573	171,418	13.44	
1960–1969	15,165	311,540 (Note: One large fire, on April 20–21, 1963, is responsible for 183,000 acres of this decade's total. There would have been a generally downward trend from the totals of the previous decades. Without this one fire, the decade's total would have been approximately 128,000 acres.)	20.5	
1970–1979	16,746	122,718	7.3	
1980–1989	15,776	79,580	5.2	
1991–2000	16,147	69,497	4.3	
2001–2010 (Note: The totals for 2001 to 2010 were calculated by budget line figures from the state budgets, as follows 2001: 1,715 fires, 3,142 acres burned; 2002: 1,929 fires, 4,476 acres burned; 2003: 1,180 fires, 3,893 acres burned; 2004: 1,069 fires, 447 acres burned; 2005: 1,087 fires 1,170 acres burned; 2006: 2,367 fires, 2,716 acres burned; 2007: 1,271 fires, 18,888 acres burned; 2008: 1,618 fires, 19,192 acres burned; 2009: 1,054 fires, 3,361 acres burned; 2010: 833 fires, 2,649 acres burned.)	14,123	59,934	4.2	
2011–2014 (Note: The totals for 2011 to 2014 were calculated by budget line figures from the state budgets, as follows: 2011: 1,228 fires, 5,384 acres burned; 2012: 1,479 fires, 2,464 acres burned; 2013: 830 fires, 1,327 acres burned; 2014: 1,063 fires, 6,692 acres burned.)	4,600	15,867	3.45	
TOTALS	142,826	3,481,299	24.4	-

=== Law enforcement duties and jurisdiction ===
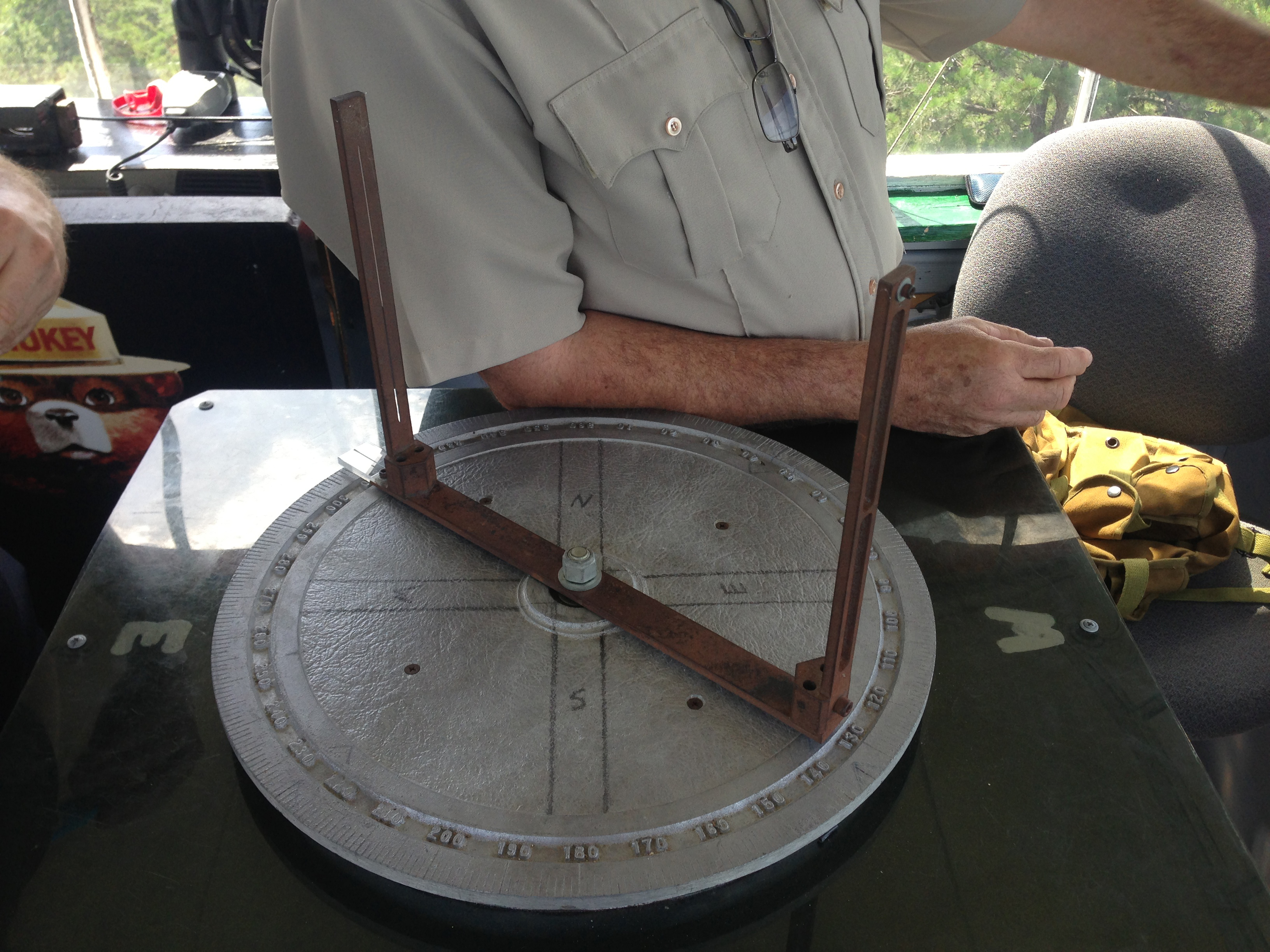
An alidade in the Apple Pie Hill fire tower is used to triangulate the location of smoke rising from a wildland fire.

Firewardens are trained law enforcement officers empowered to enforce the provisions of New Jersey's General Forest Fire Act, and the succeeding Forest Fire Prevention and Control Act. In particular, they have the authority to control and direct "all persons and apparatus engaged in extinguishing fires in forests. They may plough lands or set back fires to check any fire. They may summon any person between the ages of 18 and 50 years, living or being within their jurisdiction, to assist in extinguishing fires, and may require the use of any property needed for such purpose." State law forbids any person or party from interfering with a firewarden or their crew in carrying out their duties, or to refuse assistance or the use of property to a firewarden engaged in fire fighting operations.

A firewarden may demand that a property owner remove an identified fire hazard or any public nuisance situation that could cause or aid the spread of a forest fire. The property owner would be given a limited time to remove the hazard at their own cost, or if he neglects to do so, the firewarden may remove the hazard and charge the costs to the property owner or other responsible party. Further, during a period of drought or high danger of fires, the state Department of Environmental Protection can prohibit access to afflicted wildlands or suspend access to the areas for the permitted hunting and fishing season.

Firewardens often conduct or assist in investigations to establish the cause of a wildfire and to assign liability for a person or party responsible for damages or costs. A firewarden has the authority to levy fines and seek the reimbursement for the costs of fighting a wildfire and for the damages caused. In some cases, these investigations result in criminal prosecution (in cases of arson) or civil liability (accidental fires, negligence). Because of the inherent danger of a wildfire, a firewarden is given the authority to place any person under arrest without warrant whom he has probable cause to believe has committed arson, has set a fire without permission, or for otherwise violating the state's forest fire laws.

=== Agricultural burning and recreational fire permits ===
The Forest Fire Service is the agency responsible for administering and issuing permits for agricultural open burning in order to clear lands for agricultural cultivation and use, pruning and cullings, to remove herbaceous plant life or hedgerows, or to eradicate infested plant life (including invasive species)". Permits are also given for recreational fires, such as seasonal campfires, or bonfires at an event or ceremony. Private residents or corporations cannot set fires without first receiving a permit from the Forest Fire Service. State law prohibits the setting of fire to forests and wildlands, specifically "to start fires anywhere and permit them to spread to forests, thereby, causing damage to or threat to life or property, either accidentally or otherwise, directly or indirectly, in person or by agent, or cause to be burned, waste, fallows, stumps, logs, brush, dry grass, fallen timber or any property, material, or vegetation being grown thereon, or anything that may cause a forest fire". State regulations prohibit use of fire in the disposal of rubbish, garbage, trade waste, buildings or structures, salvage operations, or the burning of fallen leaves.

== Operations ==
=== Equipment and personnel ===
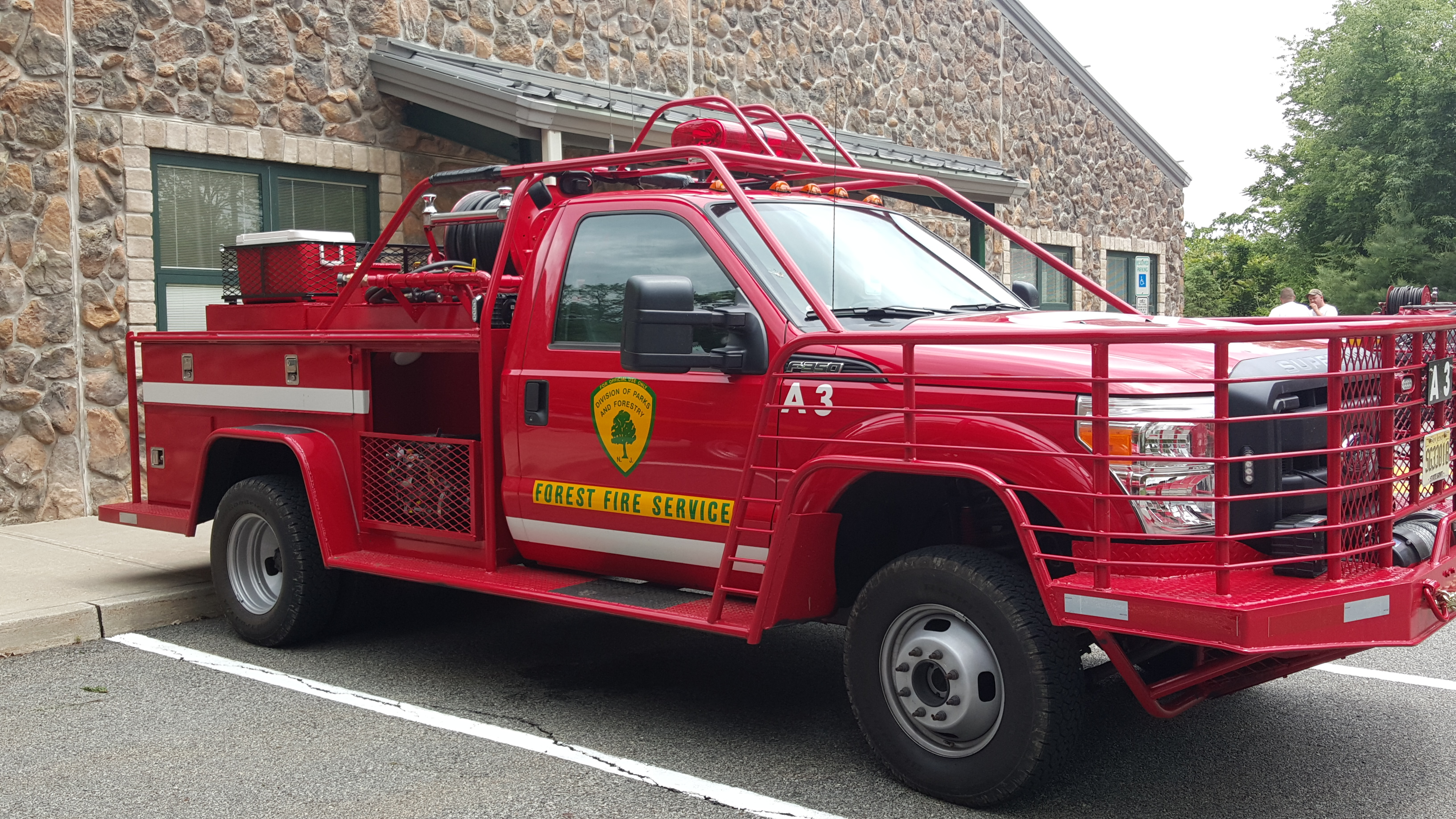
Built from a Ford F350 pickup truck frame, this NJFFS Brush Engine is a Type 6 Wildland Engine.

The New Jersey Forest Fire Service is the largest firefighting agency in New Jersey. The agency employs over 2,000 part-time, on-call, paid wildland firefighters, and 89 full-time civil service positions that include professional firefighting personnel (division and section firewardens), forest fire observers, fleet repair personnel, office staff, and other support personnel. All crewmen receive training that includes the S-130/S-190 training courses on fire behavior and firefighting techniques, as well as coursework on human factors in wildland firefighting (L-180) and traffic incident management and safety training (TIMS). All firefighters also obtain basic qualifications regarding incident response and chain of command under the National Incident Management System and Incident Command System provided by the Federal Emergency Management Agency (I-100 and I-700). Further qualifications and training courses are made available to firefighters for continuing education on a rotating schedule in accordance with the National Wildfire Coordinating Group's PMS 310-1 and separate state training requirements.

According to their website, the Forest Fire Service fields "a fleet of 273 vehicles, 23 dozer-with-plow units, 164 pieces of specialized equipment and 6 aircraft for a total fleet of 460." As of November 2012, the agency's fire apparatus included 97 off-road wildland engines equipped with full brush cages and steel plating, 96 of which are type 6 engines. It further includes twelve type 4 engines. Further, the agency "constructs all of its own initial attack fire suppression vehicles". It also participates in the Federal Excess Personal Property (FEPP) program where it receives surplus equipment and apparatus from the federal government from pumps and fire hose to trucks, heavy equipment and aircraft.

The agency often sends teams of firefighters and other resources to fight wildfires in the Western United States as part of a cooperative aid agreement with the U.S. Forest Service that has been in place since 1985. When resources and assistance is requested for out-of-state incidents, the U.S. Forest Service reimburses the state for all costs associated with the deployment of crews and equipment. in the summer of 2015, approximately 50 New Jersey Forest Fire Service crewmembers and wardens were deployed to assist on large wildfire incidents in Montana, Oregon, and Washington state.

=== Aviation ===
The New Jersey Forest Fire Service facilitates aerial attacks on wildland fires using helicopters (Helitack), spray planes, and airtankers based at three air attack bases operating in each of the agency's regional divisions. The service's aviation branch operates helicopters and planes obtained through the Federal Excess Property Program and through government contracting with private operators. However, the service's aircraft do utilize other airports in the state. The three fields owned and operated by the New Jersey Forest Fire Service are:

- Aeroflex–Andover Airport (FAA LID: 12N) is a public-use general aviation airport in Andover Township in Kittatinny Valley State Park. It has one 1,981 feet (604 m) runway designated 3/21 at an elevation of 583 feet (178 m) above mean sea level.
- Coyle Field (FAA LID: NJ20), is a private-use airport established in 1938 and located five miles southeast of Chatworth. It has three 1,800 feet (550 m) gravel runways designated North-South, Northeast-Southwest, and Northwest-Southeast at an elevation of 190 feet (58 m) above mean sea level.
- Strawberry Field (FAA LID: 89NJ), is a private-use airport located two miles north of Mays Landing. It has a 2,200 feet (670 m) turf-sand runway designated 14/32 at an elevation of 45 feet (14 m) above mean sea level.

=== Fire towers ===
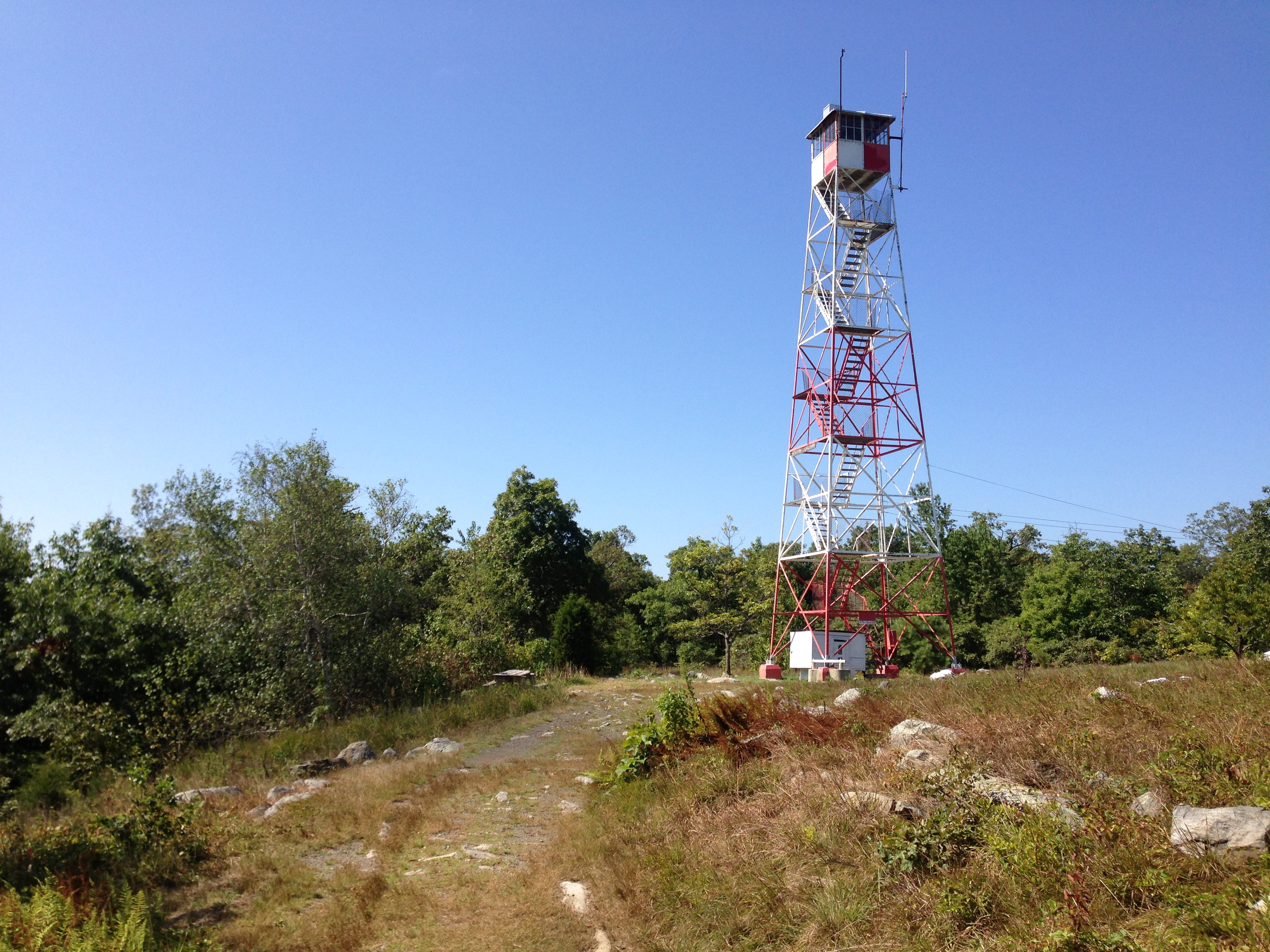
Catfish Fire Tower, on the ridge of Kittatinny Mountain, is a sixty-foot-tall tower located at 1580 feet above sea level.

The Forest Fire Service operates a system of 21 fire lookout towers at locations throughout the state. From these towers—using an instrument called the Osborne Fire Finder, or an alidade, and topographical maps—trained fire observers are able to spot and triangulate the location of possible wildfires. After ascertaining the location, the observer will file a "smoke report" which will be investigated and appropriate action taken by a local firewarden. Towers are staffed with observers during the peak fire months of March, April, May, October, and November, and when wildlands are dry enough to burn. This system of towers staffed with observers provide New Jersey an inexpensive and effective first response system that aids the New Jersey Forest Fire Service in quickly suppressing and in preventing damage caused by reported wildfires. The Forest Fire Service estimates that 25 percent of wildfires within the state every year are first spotted by a lookout.

The first fire lookout towers were privately constructed in the Pine Barrens during the late nineteenth century. However, with the creation of the Forest Fire Service in 1906, the state began erecting towers, starting with the Culvers Station (then called the Normanook Fire Tower) in 1908 along Kittatinny Mountain near Culver's Lake and the Culver's Gap. Many of the state's fire towers were built during the Great Depression by the Civilian Conservation Corps (CCC). More were erected during World War II, to aid both the Forest Fire Service and to the Aircraft Warning Service, operating from mid-1941 to mid-1944, in which fire observers were assigned additional duty as enemy aircraft spotters. During World War II, the Lakewood Station was "used to listen to German U-boat communications in the Atlantic Ocean 12 miles to the east".

== See also ==
- Fire ecology
- List of New Jersey state parks
- New Jersey Pinelands National Reserve
- Glossary of wildfire terms
