= Kittatinny Valley State Park =

State park in New Jersey, United States

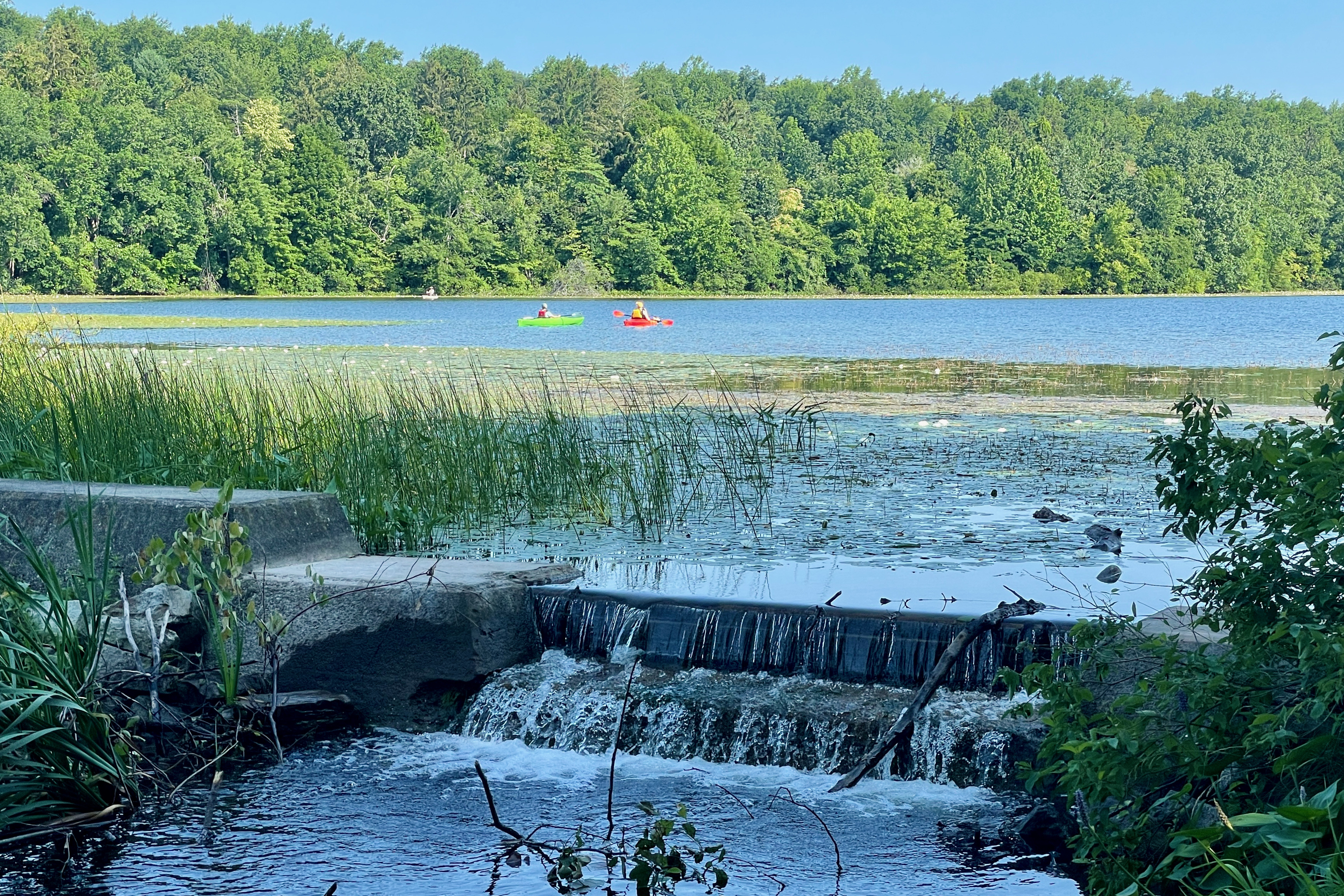
- Kayakers on Lake Aeroflex

- Location within Sussex County, New Jersey Location within New Jersey Location within the United States
- Location: Andover Township; Andover
- Coordinates: 41°00′59″N 74°44′38″W
- Area: 5,656-acre (22.89 km^{2})
- Established: 1994
- Operator: New Jersey Division of Parks and Forestry
- Website: Official website

Kittatinny Valley State Park is located in Andover Township and extends into Andover. Features include Glacial lakes, limestone outcroppings, former railroads, and a small airport. Lake Aeroflex and Gardner's Pond form part of the headwaters of the Pequest River and are excellent for fishing and boating. The park is home to a variety of wildlife such as whitetail deer, wild turkeys, a variety of songbirds, beavers, muskrats, and squirrels. The park is operated and maintained by the New Jersey Division of Parks and Forestry.

== History ==
The Hill–Hussey Stone House was first built by Sarah Hill in 1825 using native limestone. Frederick Hussey purchased the house in 1906 and added the east wing. The property was purchased by the New Jersey Green Acres program in 1994 to create the park. The house is now the visitor center. The Slater House was built in 1874 by Charles K. Slater. Once the park administrative office, it now is the District 3 Headquarters of the New Jersey State Park Police.

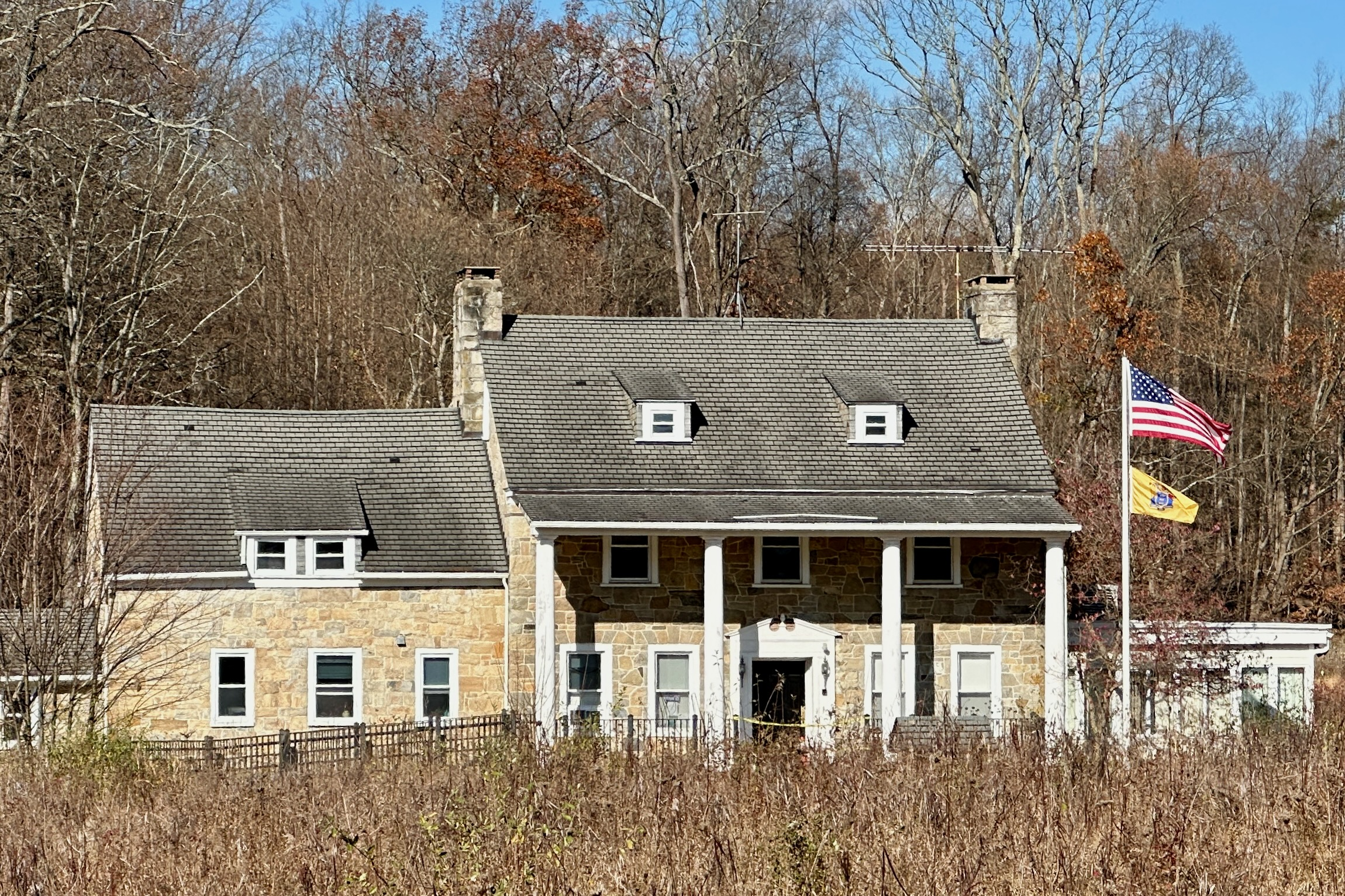
Hill–Hussey Stone House

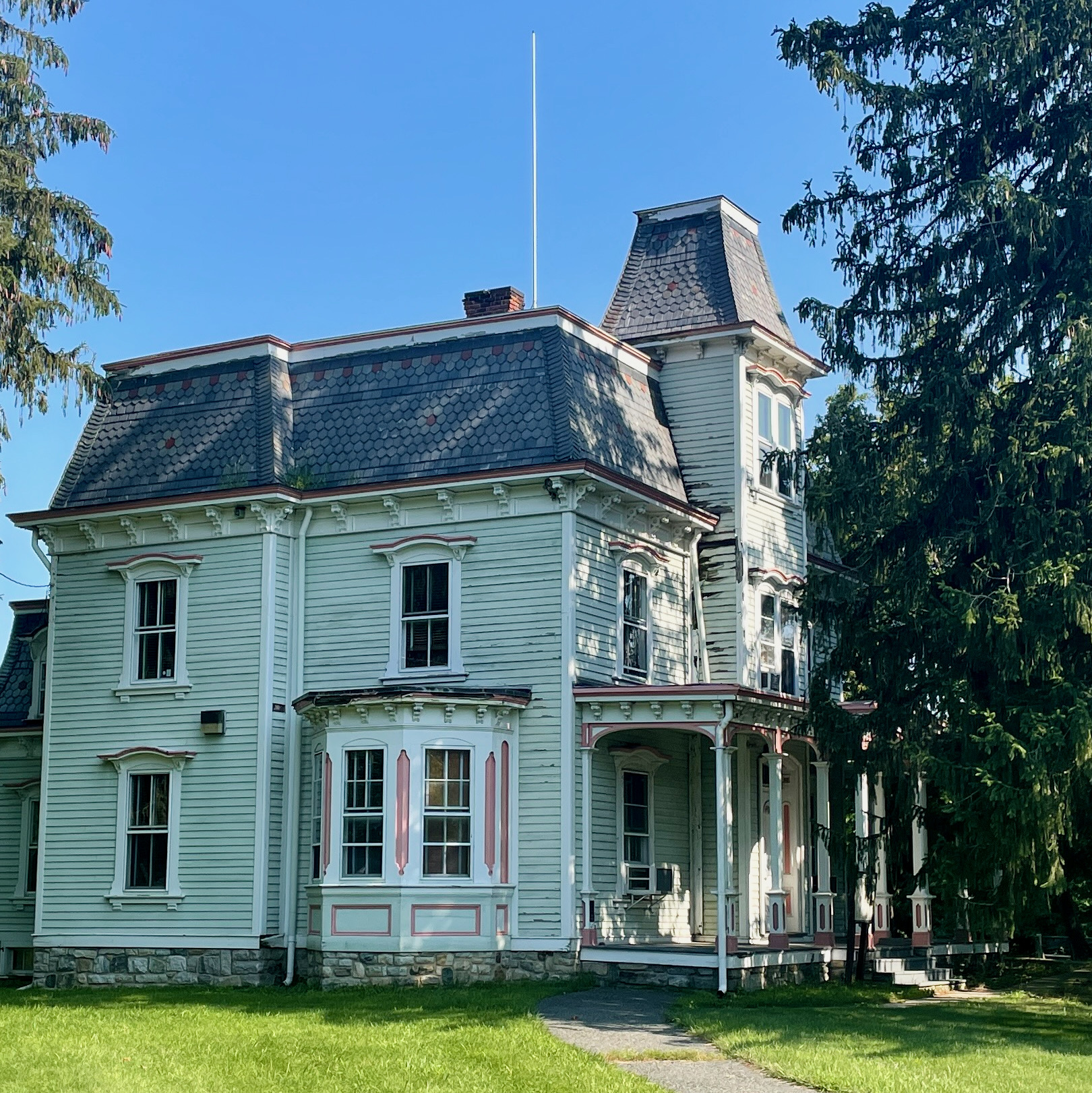
The Slater House

== Park programs ==
The park offers many different programs year-round for children and adults. Nature hikes, mountain bike rides and talks are conducted by the park staff/volunteers and are scheduled for each weekend. These include weekly walks, such as Wednesday Walkers, full moon hikes every full moon, and special hikes and programs throughout the year.

== Fishing ==
=== Lake Aeroflex (New Wawayanda Lake) ===
Lake Aeroflex, also known as New Wawayanda Lake, is 119 acres (0.48 km^{2}) in area and accessible via the shoreline or boat launch ramp. The New Jersey Division of Fish and Wildlife stocks Lake Aeroflex annually with brown and rainbow trout. Small boats may be carried by hand or small cart and launched from the shore. There is no motor vehicle access. The lake is designated a “holdover trout lake.” During the winter months, Lake Aeroflex is open for ice-fishing (conditions permitting).

=== Gardner’s Pond ===
Gardner's Pond is a 39-acre (160,000 m^{2}) pond that can be accessed through the small plane parking area of the Aeroflex–Andover Airport. Small boats may be carried by hand or small cart and launched from the shore. There is no motor vehicle access. During the winter months, Gardner's Pond is open for ice-fishing (conditions permitting).

=== Twin Lakes ===
Twin Lakes is a 29-acre (120,000 m^{2}) lake located off of Goodale Road in Andover Township. Fishermen can access the lake using the car-top boat launch or from the shoreline. During the winter months, Twin Lakes is open for ice-fishing (conditions permitting).

=== White's Pond ===
White's Pond is accessible from the Sussex Branch Trail or from Goodale Road and is open for shoreline fishing only. During the winter months, White's Pond is open for ice-fishing (conditions permitting).

== Hunting ==
Hunting is permitted in specific areas within the park. There is no hunting allowed on or from the trails. Areas of the park to the west of Goodale Road and to the east of Limecrest Road are open for all hunting seasons. (Subject to rules and regulations of the New Jersey Department of Environmental Protection).

== Picnicking ==
A limited number of picnic tables and grills are available near the parking area on Limecrest Road. Other picnic tables are scattered through the park.

== Mountain biking ==
There are over eight miles (13 km) of rugged mountain bike trails available. Volunteers from the Bulldog Mountain Bike Team regularly maintain trails in preparation for mountain bike races held in the park each year. The terrain is varied enough to be challenging to both novice and expert riders. All trail ratings and descriptions are made by the New Jersey Department of Environmental Protection which oversees the State Park system.

== Transportation ==
Aeroflex-Andover Airport, owned and managed by the New Jersey Forest Fire Service, is located within the park. It is both a general aviation airport and an airbase for aerial wildfire suppression.

== Trails ==
=== Sussex Branch Trail ===
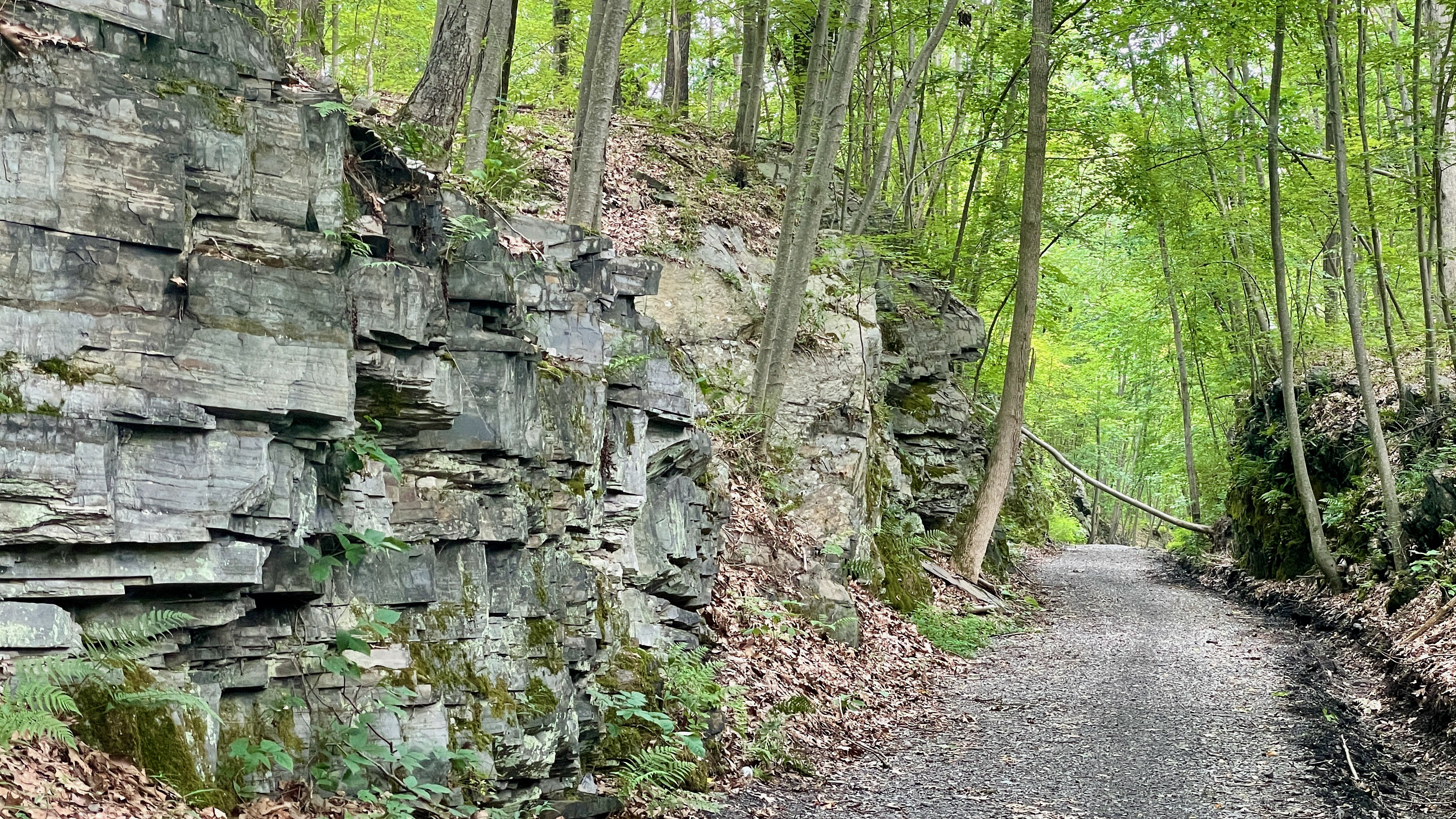
Sussex Branch Trail passing through the "Slate Cut"

The 20-mile (32 km) Sussex Branch Trail passes through swamps, lakes, fields and several communities. Many features from its previous existence as a railroad can be exhibited. Among those features are graded fill areas, cuts through bedrock, underpasses that allowed the passage of farm equipment and dairy cattle from one side of the tracks to the other, and bridges crossing the Pequest River or Paulins Kill. The flat cinder base of the trail permits multiple uses including hiking, horseback riding, biking, cross-country skiing and dog sledding. The trail provides access for fishing and for wheelchairs in certain areas. The Sussex Branch Trail also crosses through Allamuchy Mountain State Park.
