= Hampton Township, New Jersey =

Township in Sussex County, New Jersey, US

- Township
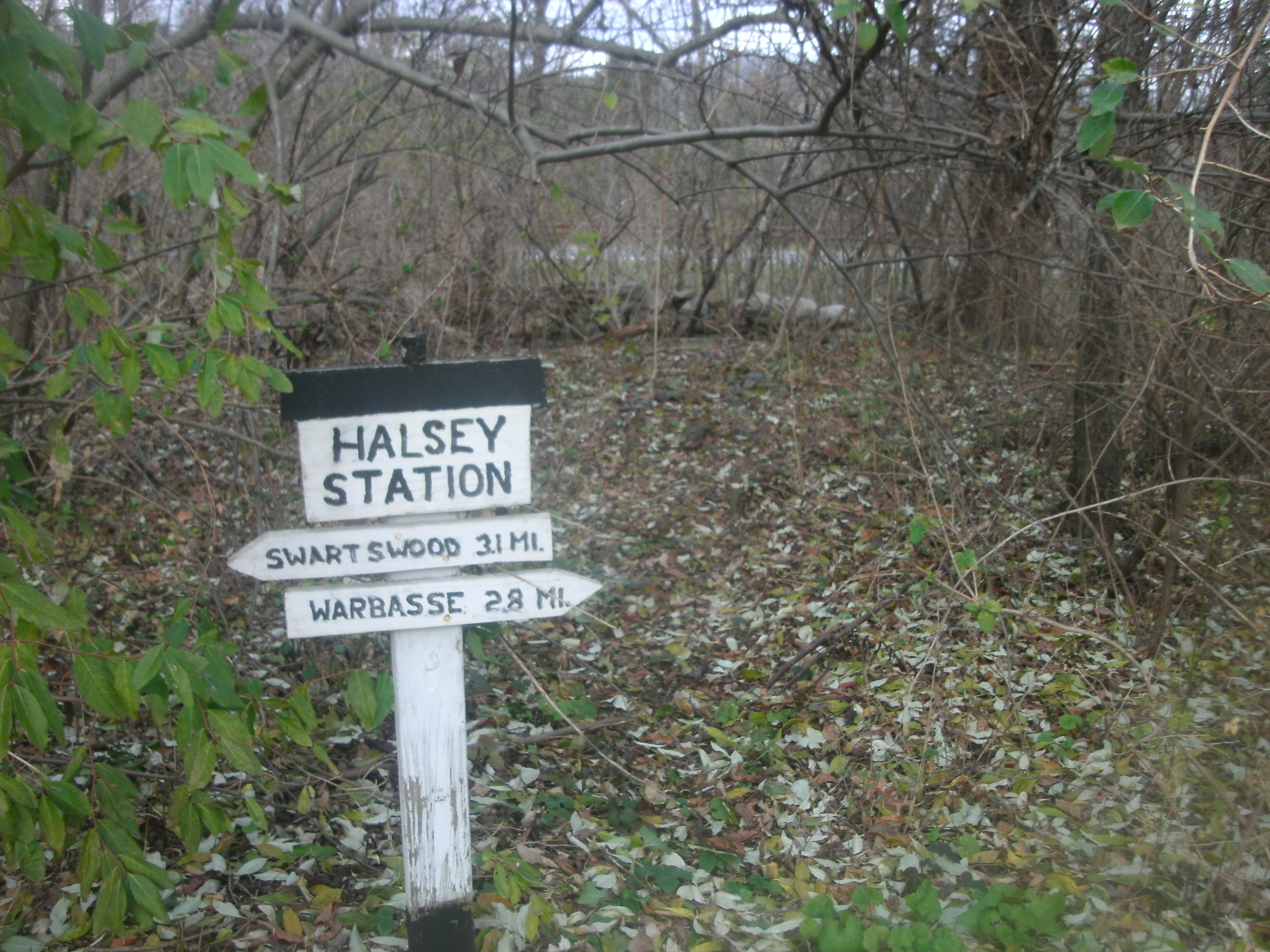
- Halsey Station

- logo

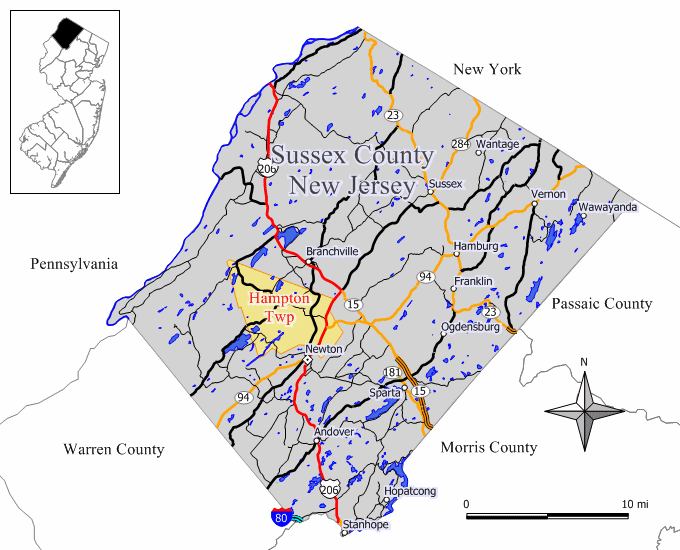
- Map of Hampton Township in Sussex County. Inset: Location of Sussex County highlighted in the State of New Jersey.

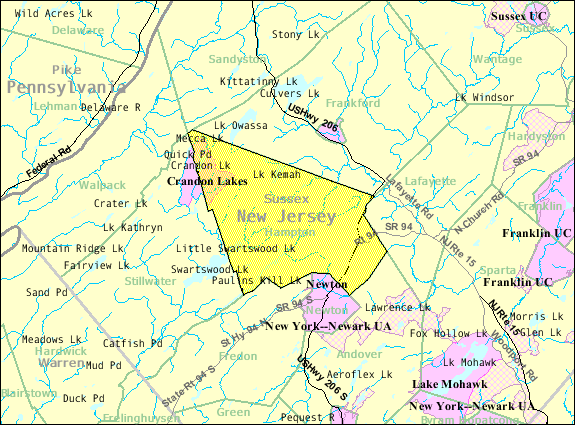
- Census Bureau map of Hampton Township, New Jersey

- Location in Sussex County Location in New Jersey Location in the United States
- Coordinates: 41.091701°N 74.789608°W
- Country: United States
- State: New Jersey
- County: Sussex
- Incorporated: April 11, 1864
- Named for: Jonathan Hampton

Government
  - Type: Township
  - Body: Township Committee
  - Mayor: Timothy Dooley (R, term ends December 31, 2026)
  - Administrator: Jessica Caruso
  - Municipal clerk: Kathleen Armstrong

Area
  - Total: 25.48 sq mi (66.00 km^{2})
  - Land: 24.57 sq mi (63.63 km^{2})
  - Water: 0.91 sq mi (2.36 km^{2}) 3.58%
  - Rank: 104th of 565 in state 9th of 24 in county
- Elevation: 594 ft (181 m)

Population (2020)
  - Total: 4,893
  - Estimate (2023): 4,902
  - Rank: 379th of 565 in state 11th of 24 in county
  - Density: 199.1/sq mi (76.9/km^{2})
  - Rank: 503rd of 565 in state 16th of 24 in county
- Time zone: UTC−05:00 (Eastern (EST))
  - Summer (DST): UTC−04:00 (Eastern (EDT))
- ZIP Code: 07860 – Newton, New Jersey
- Area code: 973
- FIPS code: 3403729490
- GNIS feature ID: 0882261
- Website: www.hamptontownshipnj.info

Hampton Township is a township in Sussex County, in the U.S. state of New Jersey. As of the 2020 United States census, the township's population was 4,893, a decrease of 303 (−5.8%) from the 2010 census count of 5,196, which in turn reflected an increase of 253 (+5.1%) from the 4,943 counted in the 2000 census.

Hampton Township was formed from portions of Sussex County by an act of the New Jersey Legislature on April 11, 1864. The township was named for Jonathan Hampton, who donated land in 1769 to the Episcopal Church of Newton. State legislator Robert Hamilton, an Episcopalian, appreciated Hampton's generosity, and gave the township its name. Portions of the township were taken on February 24, 1904, to form Fredon Township.

== Geography ==
According to the United States Census Bureau, Hampton township had a total area of 25.48 square miles (66.00 km^{2}), including 24.57 square miles (63.63 km^{2}) of land and 0.91 square miles (2.36 km^{2}) of water (3.58%). The township is located in the Kittatinny Valley, a section of the Great Appalachian Valley that stretches 1,200 miles (1,900 km) from Quebec to Alabama.

Crandon Lakes (with a 2010 Census population of 682 in Hampton Township, out of a CDP total of 1,178) is an unincorporated community and census-designated place (CDP) split between Hampton Township and Stillwater Township. Other unincorporated communities, localities and place names located partially or completely within the township include Balesville, Emmons Station, Halsey, Lake Kemah, Little Swartswood Lake, Mecca Lake, Myrtle Grove, Paulins Kill Lake, Smiths Hill, Spring Lake and Washingtonville.

Smiths Hill is a hill located at 41.0825969°N 74.7468316°W in the Kittatinny Valley of the Appalachian Mountains. The summit rises to 863 feet (263 m).

The township borders the Sussex County municipalities of Frankford Township, Fredon Township, Lafayette Township, Newton and Stillwater Township.

== Demographics ==
Historical population
Census	Pop.	Note	%±
1870	1,023		—
1880	895		−12.5%
1890	866		−3.2%
1900	775		−10.5%
1910	671	*	−13.4%
1920	592		−11.8%
1930	581		−1.9%
1940	611		5.2%
1950	668		9.3%
1960	1,174		75.7%
1970	2,091		78.1%
1980	3,916		87.3%
1990	4,438		13.3%
2000	4,943		11.4%
2010	5,196		5.1%
2020	4,893		−5.8%
2023 (est.)	4,902		0.2%
Population sources: 1870–1920 1870 1880–1890; 1890–1910 1910–1930; 1940–2000 2000; 2010 2020 * = Lost territory in previous decade.

=== 2010 census ===
The 2010 United States census counted 5,196 people, 2,021 households, and 1,445 families in the township. The population density was 213.2 per square mile (82.3/km^{2}). There were 2,200 housing units at an average density of 90.3 per square mile (34.9/km^{2}). The racial makeup was 96.44% (5,011) White, 0.83% (43) Black or African American, 0.08% (4) Native American, 1.19% (62) Asian, 0.02% (1) Pacific Islander, 0.44% (23) from other races, and 1.00% (52) from two or more races. Hispanic or Latino of any race were 3.85% (200) of the population.

Of the 2,021 households, 28.1% had children under the age of 18; 60.0% were married couples living together; 8.3% had a female householder with no husband present and 28.5% were non-families. Of all households, 23.6% were made up of individuals and 9.6% had someone living alone who was 65 years of age or older. The average household size was 2.55 and the average family size was 3.03.

21.0% of the population were under the age of 18, 7.7% from 18 to 24, 21.3% from 25 to 44, 35.1% from 45 to 64, and 14.8% who were 65 years of age or older. The median age was 44.9 years. For every 100 females, the population had 95.8 males. For every 100 females ages 18 and older there were 93.9 males.

The Census Bureau's 2006–2010 American Community Survey showed that (in 2010 inflation-adjusted dollars) median household income was $77,639 (with a margin of error of +/− $5,453) and the median family income was $86,795 (+/− $7,981). Males had a median income of $63,168 (+/− $9,682) versus $37,682 (+/− $3,054) for females. The per capita income for the borough was $32,953 (+/− $3,286). About 3.0% of families and 7.1% of the population were below the poverty line, including 4.4% of those under age 18 and 6.1% of those age 65 or over.

=== 2000 census ===
As of the 2000 United States census there were 4,943 people, 1,857 households, and 1,413 families residing in the township. The population density was 200.7 inhabitants per square mile (77.5/km^{2}). There were 2,026 housing units at an average density of 82.3 per square mile (31.8/km^{2}). The racial makeup of the township was 97.29% White, 0.97% African American, 0.02% Native American, 0.67% Asian, 0.02% Pacific Islander, 0.30% from other races, and 0.73% from two or more races. 1.90% of the population were Hispanic or Latino of any race.

There were 1,857 households, out of which 36.9% had children under the age of 18 living with them, 64.2% were married couples living together, 8.9% had a female householder with no husband present, and 23.9% were non-families. 20.7% of all households were made up of individuals, and 7.7% had someone living alone who was 65 years of age or older. The average household size was 2.65 and the average family size was 3.10.

In the township the population was spread out, with 26.5% under the age of 18, 5.5% from 18 to 24, 28.5% from 25 to 44, 28.4% from 45 to 64, and 11.1% who were 65 years of age or older. The median age was 40 years. For every 100 females, there were 95.4 males. For every 100 females age 18 and over, there were 91.3 males.

The median income for a household in the township was $60,698, and the median income for a family was $67,386. Males had a median income of $48,882 versus $36,500 for females. The per capita income for the township was $25,353. 2.0% of the population and 1.2% of families were below the poverty line. Out of the total population, 2.0% of those under the age of 18 and 2.2% of those 65 and older were living below the poverty line.

== Government ==
=== Local government ===
Hampton Township is governed under the Township form of New Jersey municipal government, one of 141 municipalities (of the 564) statewide that use this form, the second-most commonly used form of government in the state. The Township Committee is comprised of five members, who are elected directly by the voters at-large in partisan elections to serve three-year terms of office on a staggered basis, with either one or two seats coming up for election each year as part of the November general election in a three-year cycle. At an annual reorganization meeting, the Township Committee selects one of its members to serve as Mayor.

As of 2024, members of the Hampton Township Committee are Mayor Timothy S. Dooley (R, term on committee and as mayor ends December 31, 2024), David S. Hansen (R, 2026), Eileen Klose (R, 2025), Ed Ramm (R, 2024) and Philip L. Yetter (R, 2026).

In January 2015, the township committee selected Scott MacKenzie to fill the vacant seat of Keith Gourlay expiring in December 2016. MacKenzie served on an interim basis until the November 2015 general election, when he was elected to serve the one year remaining on the term of office, while Keith Gourlay—who had left office earlier—was elected to a term expiring in December 2018.

The township passed an ordinance that prohibits short-term rentals below 150 days as of May 2021, targeting people using companies such as Airbnb.

=== Federal, state and county representation ===
Hampton Township is located in the 5th Congressional District and is part of New Jersey's 24th state legislative district.

For the 119th United States Congress, New Jersey's 5th congressional district is represented by Josh Gottheimer (D, Wyckoff). New Jersey is represented in the United States Senate by Democrats Cory Booker (Newark, term ends 2027) and Andy Kim (Moorestown, term ends 2031).

For the 2026–2027 session, the 24th legislative district of the New Jersey Legislature is represented in the State Senate by Parker Space (R, Wantage Township) and in the General Assembly by Dawn Fantasia (R, Franklin) and Mike Inganamort (R, Chester Township).

Sussex County is governed by a Board of County Commissioners whose five members are elected at-large in partisan elections on a staggered basis, with either one or two seats coming up for election each year. At an annual reorganization meeting held in the beginning of January, the board selects a Commissioner Director and Deputy Director from among its members, with day-to-day supervision of the operation of the county delegated to a County Administrator. As of 2025, Sussex County's Commissioners are Director Jill Space (R, Wantage Township, 2025), Deputy Director Chris Carney (R, Frankford Township, 2027), Jack DeGroot (R, Sussex, 2026), William Hayden (I, Branchville, 2025) and Alan Henderson (R, Lafayette Township, 2027).

Constitutional officers elected on a countywide basis are Clerk Jeffrey M. Parrott (R, Wantage Township, 2026), Sheriff Michael F. Strada (R, Hampton Township, 2025) and Surrogate Gary R. Chiusano (R, Frankford Township, 2028).

=== Politics ===
As of March 2011, there were a total of 3,600 registered voters in Hampton Township, of which 615 (17.1% vs. 16.5% countywide) were registered as Democrats, 1,565 (43.5% vs. 39.3%) were registered as Republicans and 1,418 (39.4% vs. 44.1%) were registered as Unaffiliated. There were 2 voters registered as either Libertarians or Greens. Among the township's 2010 Census population, 69.3% (vs. 65.8% in Sussex County) were registered to vote, including 87.7% of those ages 18 and over (vs. 86.5% countywide).

Gubernatorial election results for Hampton Township
Year	Republican		Democratic		Third party(ies)	
Year	No.	%	No.	%	No.	%
2025	1,472	61.56%	894	37.39%	25	1.05%
2021	1,439	68.10%	658	31.14%	16	0.76%
2017	1,020	59.30%	607	35.29%	93	5.41%
2013	1,100	71.66%	385	25.08%	50	3.26%
2009	1,226	63.23%	508	26.20%	205	10.57%
2005	905	55.73%	630	38.79%	89	5.48%

In the 2012 presidential election, Republican Mitt Romney received 1,479 votes (58.3% vs. 59.4% countywide), ahead of Democrat Barack Obama with 989 votes (39.0% vs. 38.2%) and other candidates with 55 votes (2.2% vs. 2.1%), among the 2,535 ballots cast by the township's 3,676 registered voters, for a turnout of 69.0% (vs. 68.3% in Sussex County). In the 2008 presidential election, Republican John McCain received 1,636 votes (58.3% vs. 59.2% countywide), ahead of Democrat Barack Obama with 1,109 votes (39.6% vs. 38.7%) and other candidates with 32 votes (1.1% vs. 1.5%), among the 2,804 ballots cast by the township's 3,517 registered voters, for a turnout of 79.7% (vs. 76.9% in Sussex County). In the 2004 presidential election, Republican George W. Bush received 1,641 votes (63.6% vs. 63.9% countywide), ahead of Democrat John Kerry with 887 votes (34.4% vs. 34.4%) and other candidates with 45 votes (1.7% vs. 1.3%), among the 2,579 ballots cast by the township's 3,257 registered voters, for a turnout of 79.2% (vs. 77.7% in the whole county).

United States presidential election results for Hampton Township 2024 2020 2016 2012 2008 2004
Year	Republican		Democratic		Third party(ies)	
Year	No.	%	No.	%	No.	%
2024	1,978	64.35%	1,047	34.06%	49	1.59%
2020	1,982	61.48%	1,192	36.97%	50	1.55%
2016	1,746	64.10%	863	31.68%	115	4.22%
2012	1,479	58.62%	989	39.20%	55	2.18%
2008	1,636	58.91%	1,109	39.94%	32	1.15%
2004	1,641	63.78%	887	34.47%	45	1.75%

In the 2013 gubernatorial election, Republican Chris Christie received 71.7% of the vote (1,100 cast), ahead of Democrat Barbara Buono with 25.1% (385 votes), and other candidates with 3.3% (50 votes), among the 1,550 ballots cast by the township's 3,684 registered voters (15 ballots were spoiled), for a turnout of 42.1%. In the 2009 gubernatorial election, Republican Chris Christie received 1,226 votes (61.9% vs. 63.3% countywide), ahead of Democrat Jon Corzine with 538 votes (27.1% vs. 25.7%), Independent Chris Daggett with 184 votes (9.3% vs. 9.1%) and other candidates with 21 votes (1.1% vs. 1.3%), among the 1,982 ballots cast by the township's 3,547 registered voters, yielding a 55.9% turnout (vs. 52.3% in the county).

United States Senate election results for Hampton Township1
Year	Republican		Democratic		Third party(ies)	
Year	No.	%	No.	%	No.	%
2024	1,933	64.26%	998	33.18%	77	2.56%
2018	1,474	63.15%	729	31.23%	131	5.61%
2012	1,450	58.70%	925	37.45%	95	3.85%
2006	985	59.12%	624	37.45%	57	3.42%

United States Senate election results for Hampton Township2
Year	Republican		Democratic		Third party(ies)	
Year	No.	%	No.	%	No.	%
2020	1,884	59.83%	1,192	37.85%	73	2.32%
2014	822	60.40%	503	36.96%	36	2.65%
2013	692	64.19%	375	34.79%	11	1.02%
2008	1,593	58.72%	1,008	37.15%	112	4.13%

== Education ==
The Hampton Township School District serves public school students in pre-kindergarten through sixth grade at McKeown School. As of the 2022–23 school year, the district, comprised of one school, had an enrollment of 323 students and 39.2 classroom teachers (on an FTE basis), for a student–teacher ratio of 8.2:1.

Students in seventh through twelfth grade for public school attend Kittatinny Regional High School located in Hampton Township, which serves students who reside in Fredon, Hampton, Sandyston, Stillwater and Walpack townships. The high school is located on a 96-acre (39 ha) campus in Hampton Township, about seven minutes outside of the county seat of Newton. As of the 2022–23 school year, the high school had an enrollment of 781 students and 79.5 classroom teachers (on an FTE basis), for a student–teacher ratio of 9.8:1. Kittatinny Regional High School was recognized as a National Blue Ribbon School of Excellence in 1997-98.

== Transportation ==
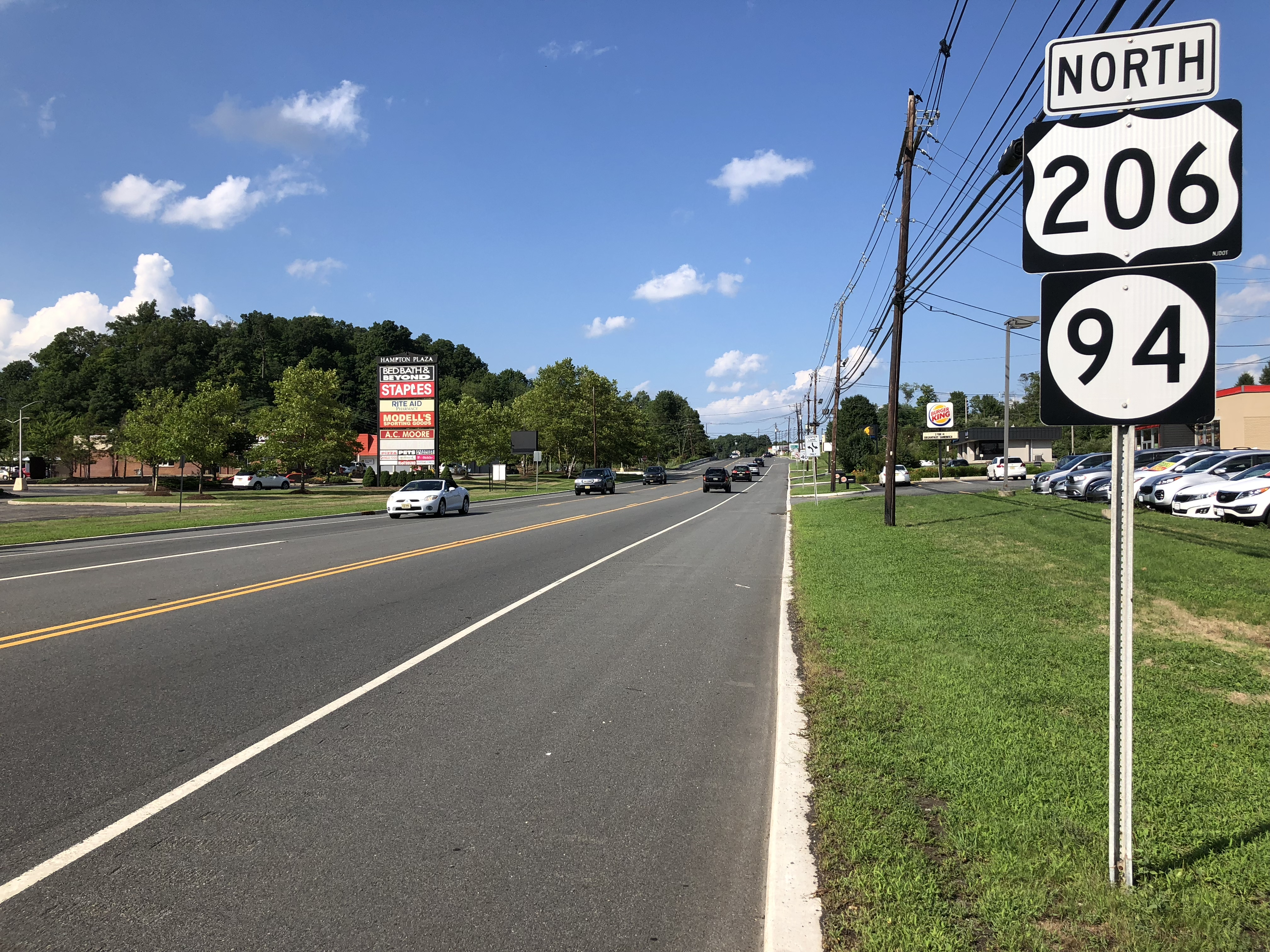
U.S. Route 206 and Route 94 northbound in Hampton Township

As of May 2010, the township had a total of 51.51 miles (82.90 km) of roadways, of which 25.99 miles (41.83 km) were maintained by the municipality, 21.24 miles (34.18 km) by Sussex County and 4.28 miles (6.89 km) by the New Jersey Department of Transportation.

U.S. Route 206 is the primary highway serving Hampton Township. Much of the section of US 206 in Hampton Township is concurrent with Route 94. Other significant roads traversing the township include County Route 519 and County Route 521.
