= Swartswood Lake =

- Swartout's Pond
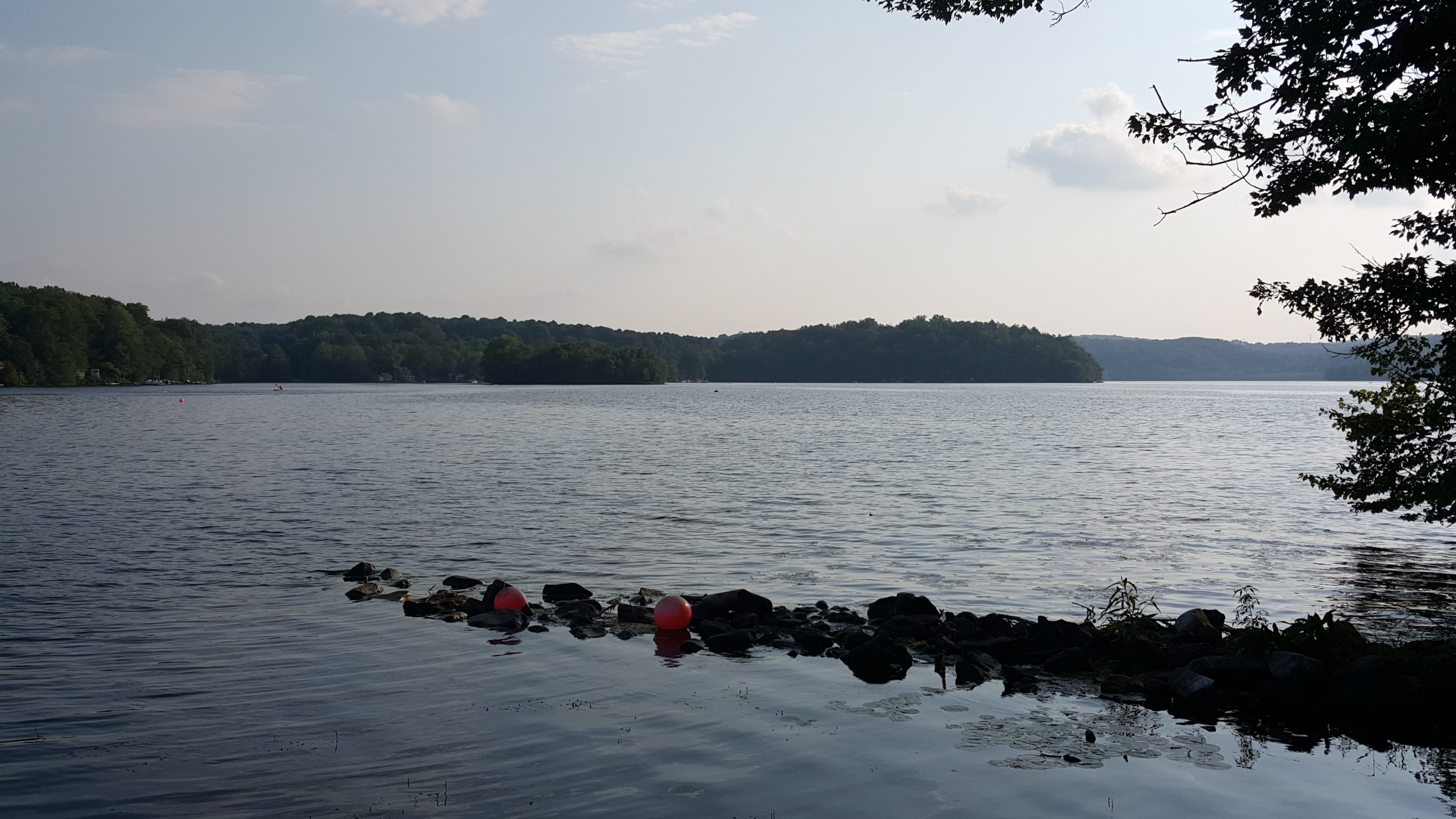
- Swartswood Lake is the third-largest freshwater lake in New Jersey

- Location within Sussex County, New Jersey Location within New Jersey
- Interactive map of Swartswood Lake
- Location: Sussex County, New Jersey
- Coordinates: 41°04′17″N 74°50′05″W
- Type: Glacial lake
- Part of: Swartswood State Park
- Primary inflows: Neldon's Brook; Indian Creek
- Primary outflows: Keen's Mill Brook
- Basin countries: United States
- Managing agency: New Jersey Division of Parks and Forestry
- Designation: Protected
- Max. length: 3 miles (4.8 km)
- Max. width: 1 mile (1.6 km)
- Average depth: 22 feet (6.7 m)
- Max. depth: 42 feet (13 m)

Swartswood Lake (previously called Swartout's Pond) is a freshwater lake located in Stillwater and Hampton townships in Sussex County, New Jersey in the United States. The lake is a 520-acre (210 ha) glacial lake that is the third-largest freshwater lake in New Jersey. The lake stretches 3 miles (4.8 km) (north-to-south) and 1 mile (1.6 km) wide (east to west); and has an average depth of 22 feet (6.7 m) with a maximum depth of 42 feet (13 m). The lake is the focus of Swartswood State Park a 3,460-acre (14.0 km^{2}) protected area administered by the New Jersey Division of Parks and Forestry.

Swartswood Lake is fed by the waters of Neldon's Brook (draining several lakes and Bear Swamp in Stillwater, Hampton, and Frankford townships; and by Indian Creek (or River) which empties Little Swartswood Lake to the north. The southern end of the lake was dammed by Charles Rhodes, Sr., in 1790 forming a mill pond in the narrow ravine at the lake's outlet, Keen's Mill Brook. The Brook flows into the Trout Brook near Middleville in Stillwater Township, a tributary of the Paulins Kill.
