= Swartswood State Park =

State park in Sussex County, New Jersey

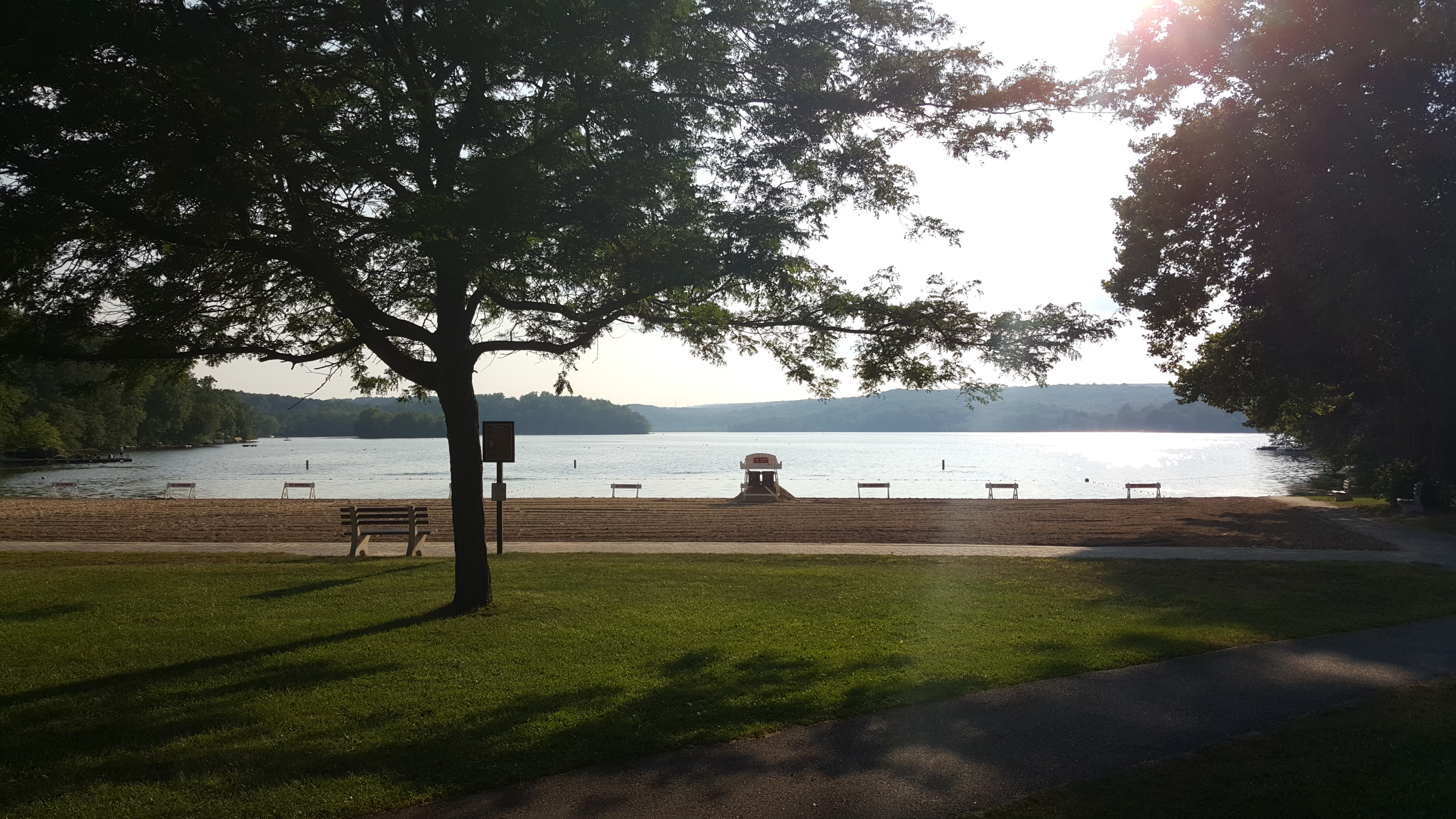
- Swartswood Lake looking south at sunset, July 2015

- Location within New Jersey Location within the United States
- Location: Stillwater and Hampton townships, Sussex County, New Jersey, United States
- Nearest town: Newton, New Jersey
- Coordinates: 41°04′25″N 74°49′08″W
- Area: 3,460 acres (14.0 km^{2})
- Elevation: 502 feet (153 m)
- Created: 1915
- Operator: New Jersey Division of Parks and Forestry
- Open: year round
- Website: Official website

Swartswood State Park is a 3,460-acre (14.0 km^{2}) protected area located in the Swartswood section of Stillwater and Hampton townships in Sussex County, New Jersey, in the United States. Established in 1915 by the state's Forest Park Reservation Commission, it was the first state park established by the state of New Jersey for the purposes of recreation at the state's third-largest freshwater lake. (Note: Beginning in 1905, the Forest Park Reservation Commission acquired land and created a few state forest reservations to preserve timber and natural resources. Swartswood was the last reserve created by the commission before it was absorbed into an executive department in 1915. The park system was managed by several agencies over the twentieth century before the creation of the New Jersey Department of Environmental Protection restructured the park system and other agencies under auspices of the Division of Parks and Forestry in 1971.) Today, Swartswood State Park is operated and maintained by the New Jersey Division of Parks and Forestry.

The park's main feature is Swartswood Lake, a 502-acre (2.03 km^{2}) glacial lake located in northwestern New Jersey's Kittatinny Valley—part of New Jersey's Ridge and Valley physiographic province. Both Swartswood Lake and the smaller Little Swartswood Lake are remnants of the retreat glaciers from the Wisconsin glaciation which began roughly 20,000 years ago. Both lakes have been the focus of water-quality improvement efforts by the state, including invasive aquatic-weed control and watershed protection in association with a local non-profit organization. The park is open all year, with many recreational activities available, including hiking, birdwatching, cross-country skiing, swimming, boating, and camping. Fishing and hunting are also permitted within the park.

== History ==
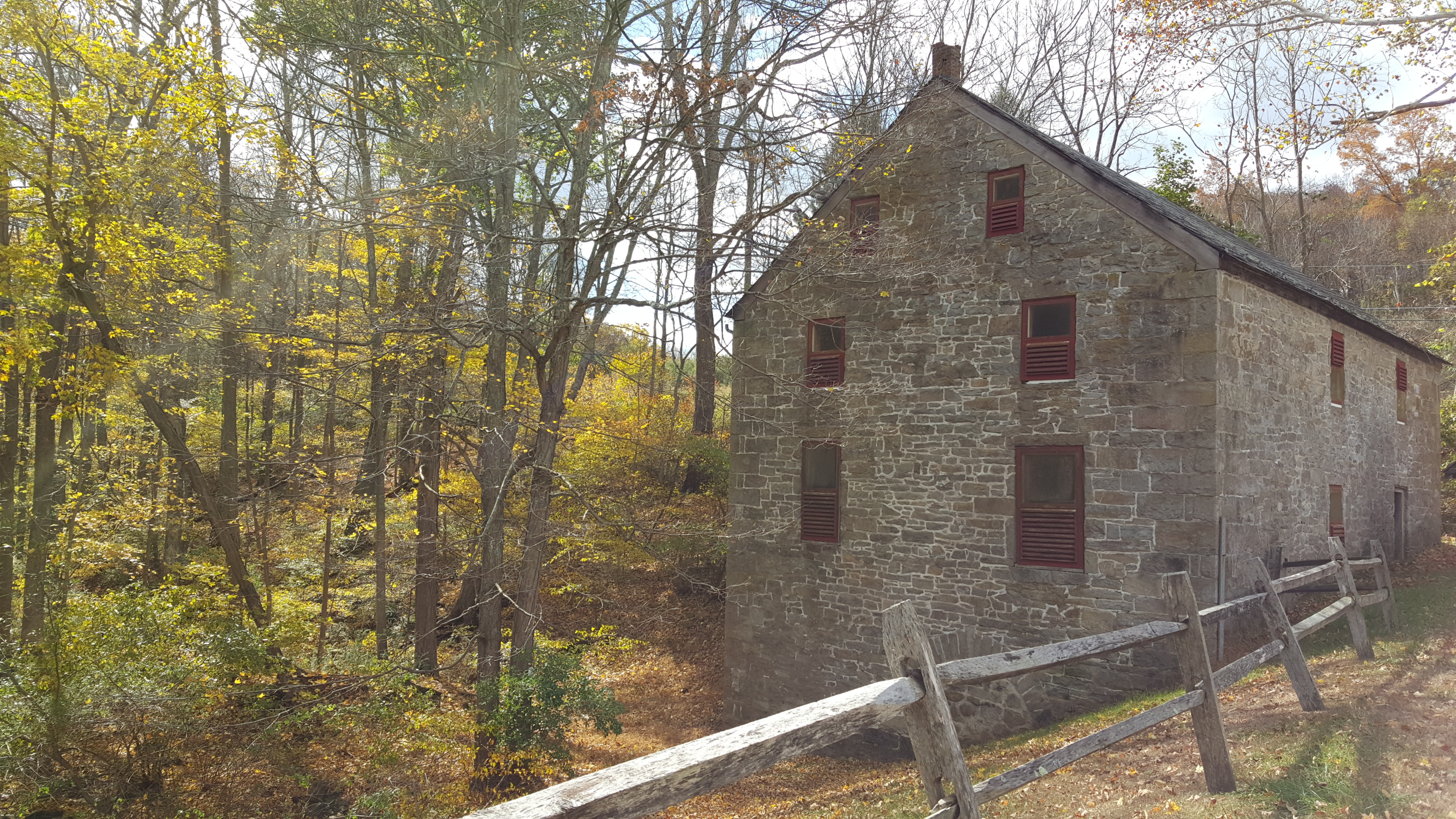
Keen's Grist Mill, built 1838, on the southern end of Swartswood Lake

In 1905, Governor Edward C. Stokes established the Forest Park Reservation Commission to begin acquiring and setting aside lands within the state of New Jersey as parks and forest reserves. The first acquisitions were forest lands with an aim toward protecting their commercial value. According to the commission's first annual report, "the forests are 'the great savings banks of nature' from which we have been taking the interest and reducing the capital". However, in 1908, the state forester, Alfred Gaskill (1861–1950), proposed the creation of parks for recreation, writing that "the aesthetic part of forestry must be dominant here because a large proportion of the people live in towns and cities and consider the forests as their playgrounds".

From his acquisition of the lake in 1888 until his death in 1905, Newark-based rubber and harness manufacturer Andrew Albright, Sr. (1830–1905), sought to prevent free public access to the lake for fishing and strenuously fought state efforts to exercise its legislative and eminent domain powers to compel such access. In August 1914, his children and heirs Andrew Albright, Jr. (1874–1930), and Elizabeth Spurr (1869–1934) sold 544 acres (2.20 km^{2}) which included the waters of Swartswood Lake, to the commission for $30,000. The transaction was finalized with deeds filed on June 30, 1915. This included the 520-acre (2.1 km^{2}) lake and approximately 20 acres (0.081 km^{2}) of land to provide nine boat launching and landing sites as well as picnic and recreation grounds. The commissioners reported that they "intended to make Swartswood a public playground. Boat liveries and picnic shelters to be maintained under proper control will make it available to a large number of people" and to stock the lake with fish. Because of its focus on recreational activities, Swartswood is considered New Jersey's first state park. The park was expanded from two tracts obtained from the farm of Newton resident George Emmans, 12.5 acres (0.051 km^{2}) in 1916 and 168 acres (0.68 km^{2}) in 1941 from his widow, Hannah Struble Emmans. A June 1962 park pamphlet described the park as "704 acres including the entire water body of Swartswood Lake. The land area consists of 185 acres with about one mile of lake frontage".

Since 1961, open space preservation and acquisition funds from the state's Green Acres Program have aided the expansion of state's protected areas, including Swartswood State Park. Recent purchases have connected the park with the Trout Brook Wildlife Management Area and provided protected habitat for wildlife including the bobcat and black bear. In 1992, the Swartswood Lakes and Watershed Association was established by local residents to "protect the water quality of Swartswood and Little Swartswood Lakes and preserve the lakes for recreational use". The association has partnered with the State Park Service, Rutgers University, and the United States Geological Survey in watershed management and conservation efforts. However, association members have criticized the New Jersey Division of Environmental Protection for failing to address the identification or harvesting of invasive species from the lake.

== Geology and geography ==
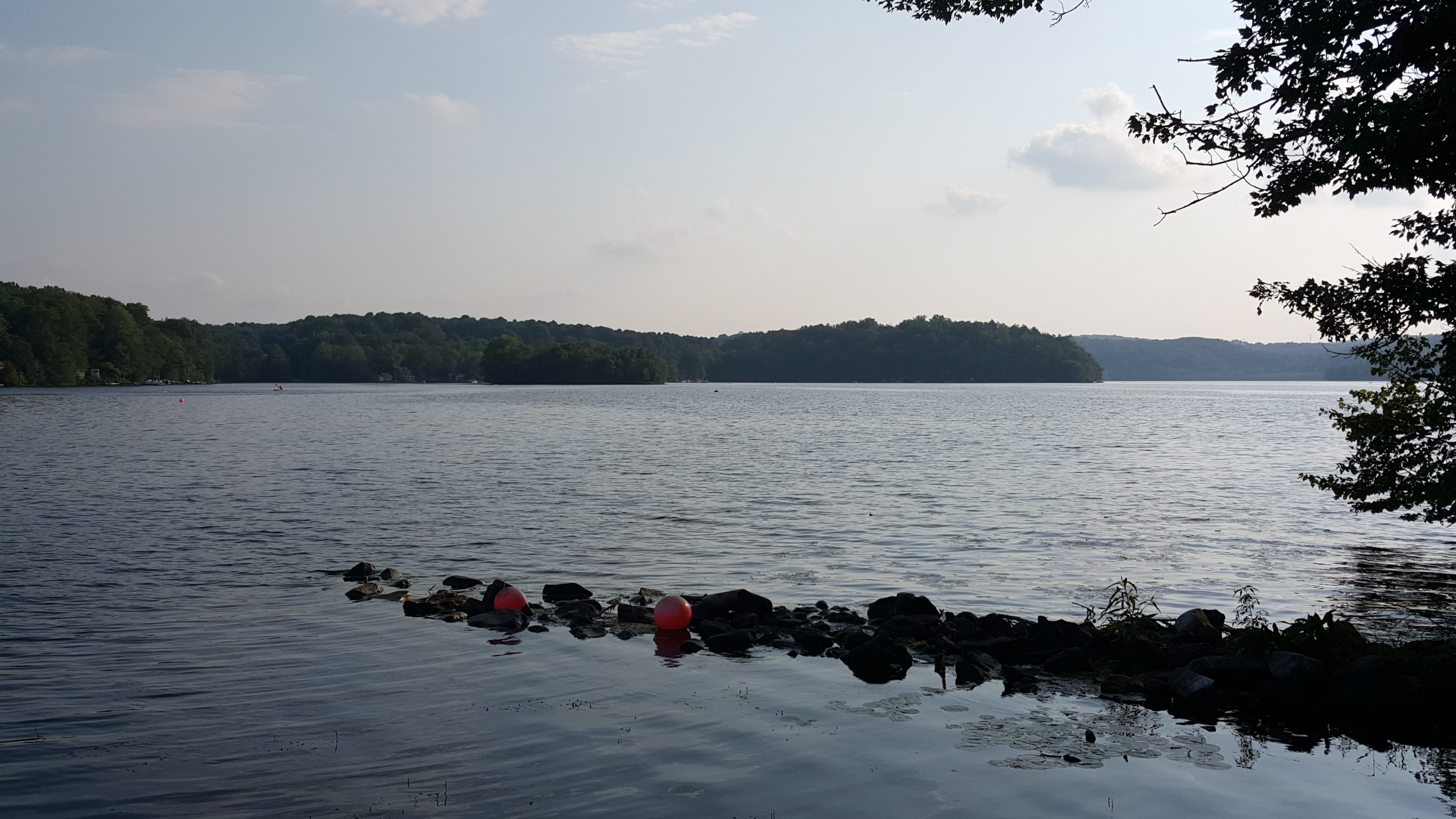
Third largest freshwater lake in New Jersey

Swartswood State Park is a 3,460-acre (14.0 km^{2}) protected area located in Stillwater and Hampton townships, New Jersey. Located at 502 feet (153 m) above mean sea level, the park is located along County Route 619 (East Shore Drive in Stillwater, Swartswood East Side Drive in Hampton) southeast of the hamlet of Swartswood.

The focus of park is Swartswood Lake, 520-acre (2.1 km^{2}) glacial lake that is the third-largest freshwater lake in New Jersey. The lake stretches 3 miles (north-to-south) and 1 mile wide (east to west); it has an average depth of 22 feet (6.7 m) with a maximum depth of 42 feet (13 m). The park's area also comprises several mountain streams, including Neldon's Brook, and other lakes, including Little Swartswood Lake—an 84-acre (0.34 km^{2}) glacial lake—as well as Duck Pond, Spring Lake, Willow Crest Lake, and Frog Pond. The park, and its bodies of water, are located within the watershed of the Paulins Kill, a tributary of the Delaware River. Camp Lou Henry Hoover, a camp affiliated with the Girl Scouts, and the 1,843.6-acre (7.461 km^{2}) Trout Brook Wildlife Management Area administered by the New Jersey Division of Fish and Wildlife are located nearby the state park.

Swartswood State Park is located in the Kittatinny Valley which is a segment of the Great Appalachian Valley that stretches from Quebec to Alabama. The valley and surrounding area is part of New Jersey's Ridge and Valley physiographic province. The surficial geology of the valley, namely its soils and parent materials, were created from materials left behind by the retreat of the Wisconsin glaciation after the Last Glacial Maximum. The topography of the valley, and the lake itself, were formed by the damming or obstruction of a river valley with extra-morainic stratified drift and till deposits. As a glacial lake, Swartswood Lake eventually will atrophy into a bog, a natural progression that is estimated to occur in 100,000 years.

The lake and valley is underlain by a two-mile-thick (3.2 km) layer called the Martinsburg Formation, a turbidite sequence of weaker sedimentary materials, mostly slate, greywacke sandstone, shale, and limestone derived from Ordovician-period deep ocean floor deposits from 540 to 400 million years ago. To the east of the lake and the park is a ridge of bedrock composed of Kittatinny Formation (a supergroup) materials that rests on the Martinsburg Formation, which includes Bushkill Member, Allentown Dolomite, Beekmantown Group, and Jacksonburg Limestone. These materials of these bedrock formations included geological components of a large Precambrian or Mesozoic continent that separated and subsequently was periodically submerged beneath shallow seas. During these intervals, these components accumulated a layer of deposited marine sediment and carbonate rock during the Ordovician and Silurian eras. Under extreme compressive stresses and pressure, marine sedimentary rocks were uplifted, during a series of mountain building periods called "orogenies" over the span of 250 million years and ending with the Appalachian or Alleghanian orogeny occurring over 325 million to 260 million years ago.

== Ecology ==
Duck Pond is a woodland vernal pool, a depression in the forest, unconnected to a stream, with a dense soil layer that impedes the water from flowing out easily. This vernal pool is a habitat for several species of plants and animal life, including wood frogs, spring peepers, and three species of salamander: Jefferson salamander (Ambystoma jeffersonianum), spotted salamander (Ambystoma maculatum); and marbled salamander (Ambystoma opacum).

Birdwatching author William J. Boyle reports that Swartswood is home to a surprising number of waterfowl species, including pied-billed grebe, wood duck, ring-necked duck, ruddy duck, American widgeon, gadwall, American coot and occasionally bald eagle.

The lake currently has populations of invasive species, including water chestnut (Trapa natans).

== Recreation and facilities ==
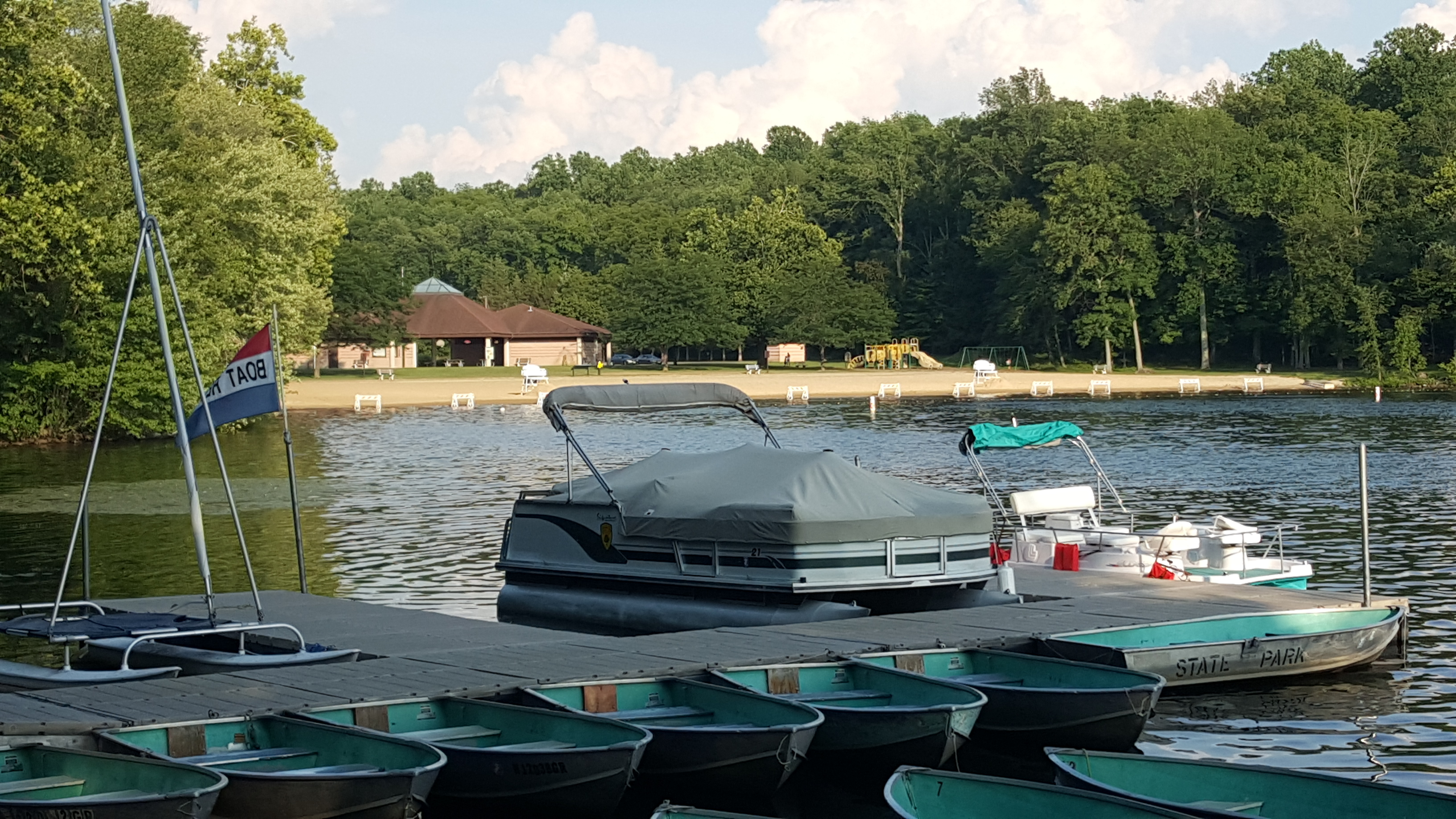
View of the beach and bathhouse from the boat docks, Swartswood Lake

=== Outdoor activities ===
The park has ten hiking trails that provide different views and natural features of Swartswood Lake or other lakes within the park and offer hikes of various levels of difficulty and differing terrains. Trails can be accessed by walking, mountain biking, or by horseback riding. In the winter, cross-country skiing and sledding is permitted. Several trails have designated bird blinds built to allow visitors the opportunity for birding or birdwatching with little disturbance to wildlife habitats.

Swimming, boating, and sunbathing are permitted on the lake. Canoes, kayaks and sailboats can be rented and several boat launch and landing sites are available around the perimeter of the lake. The park's boat launch areas permit both trailer and cartop launching, and boating with electric motors (no gasoline-powered motors) is permitted. Swimming is permitted at the beach facilities during the summer from Memorial Day weekend to Labor Day weekend when seasonal lifeguards are on duty. A concession stand (operated seasonally) and bathhouse is available at the beach.

Swartswood State Park offers 65 tent and trailer camping sites that accommodate up to six persons each and include a "fire ring, picnic table and lantern holder". The park also offers five yurt camping sites. According to the park website, "flush toilets and showers facilities are within walking distance" of these campsites. Picnic areas are located at several scenic sites around the lake equipped with picnic tables and grills. Only charcoal fires are permitted. The park also has playground facilities and for volleyball and basketball.

=== Keen's Grist Mill site ===
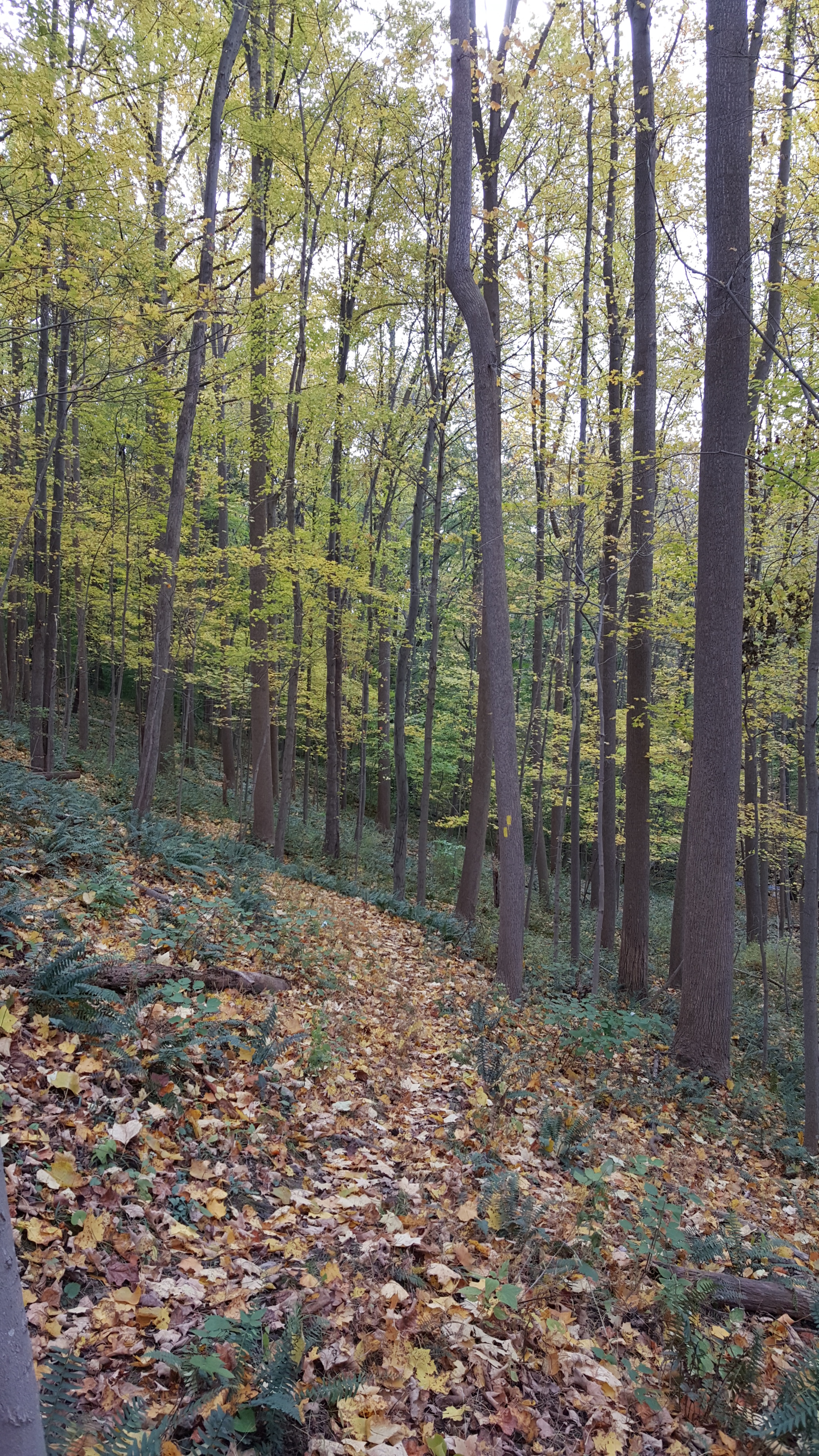
Maidenhair ferns and hardwoods along the Grist Mill Trail

Stillwater resident George Keen (1789–1866) built a grist mill at the outlet of Swartswood Lake in 1838 at the site where Charles Rhodes, Sr. (1725–1800), built an earlier mill and milldam in 1790. Keen acquired the mill property in 1824 from Rhodes' grandson and replaced the older mill with the new mill that operated with three run of grinding stones. The mill, built of local fieldstone, was driven by a 16-foot (4.9 m) fall of water from the dam and pitchback water wheel that generated 30 horsepower. After Keen's death, his son John W. Keen (1823–1898) operated the mill for 32 years until his death in 1898.

Keen's heirs sold the mill property to Dr William H. Vail (1845–1943) of Blairstown in 1901. Vail who used the mill property's dam to control waterflow in the Paulins Kill which powered the Blairstown Electric Light Company's power plant further downstream. After replacing the dam, Vail sold the mill property three years later to the trustees of Blair Academy who owned it until 1969. The state Department of Environmental Protection acquired the mill property in 1976 and incorporated it into Swartswood State Park.

The park's 1.2-mile (1.9 km) Grist Mill Trail begins at the site and features a stand of red cedar trees, steep terrain, and views of the southern parts of lake.

=== Hunting and fishing ===
Hunting and recreational fishing are permitted in several state park and state forest areas. Hunters and anglers are required to have the appropriate state hunting or fishing licenses and abide by regulations established the New Jersey Division of Fish and Wildlife. Hunting is permitted within the park boundaries in areas east of County Route 619. This comprises 1,558 acres (631 ha) or 45% of the park's area. According to the park's website, "game commonly found in the park includes ring-necked pheasant, ruffed grouse, wild turkey, gray squirrel, eastern cottontail and white-tailed deer". The New Jersey Division of Fish and Wildlife calls Swartswood Lake "one of the best walleye lakes in the State of New Jersey." The lake "are stocked with brown, rainbow and brook trout in the spring", and are also populated by channel catfish, largemouth and smallmouth bass, chain pickerel, perch and panfish. Ice fishing is permitted in the winter for pickerel, perch and brown trout.

== Gallery ==
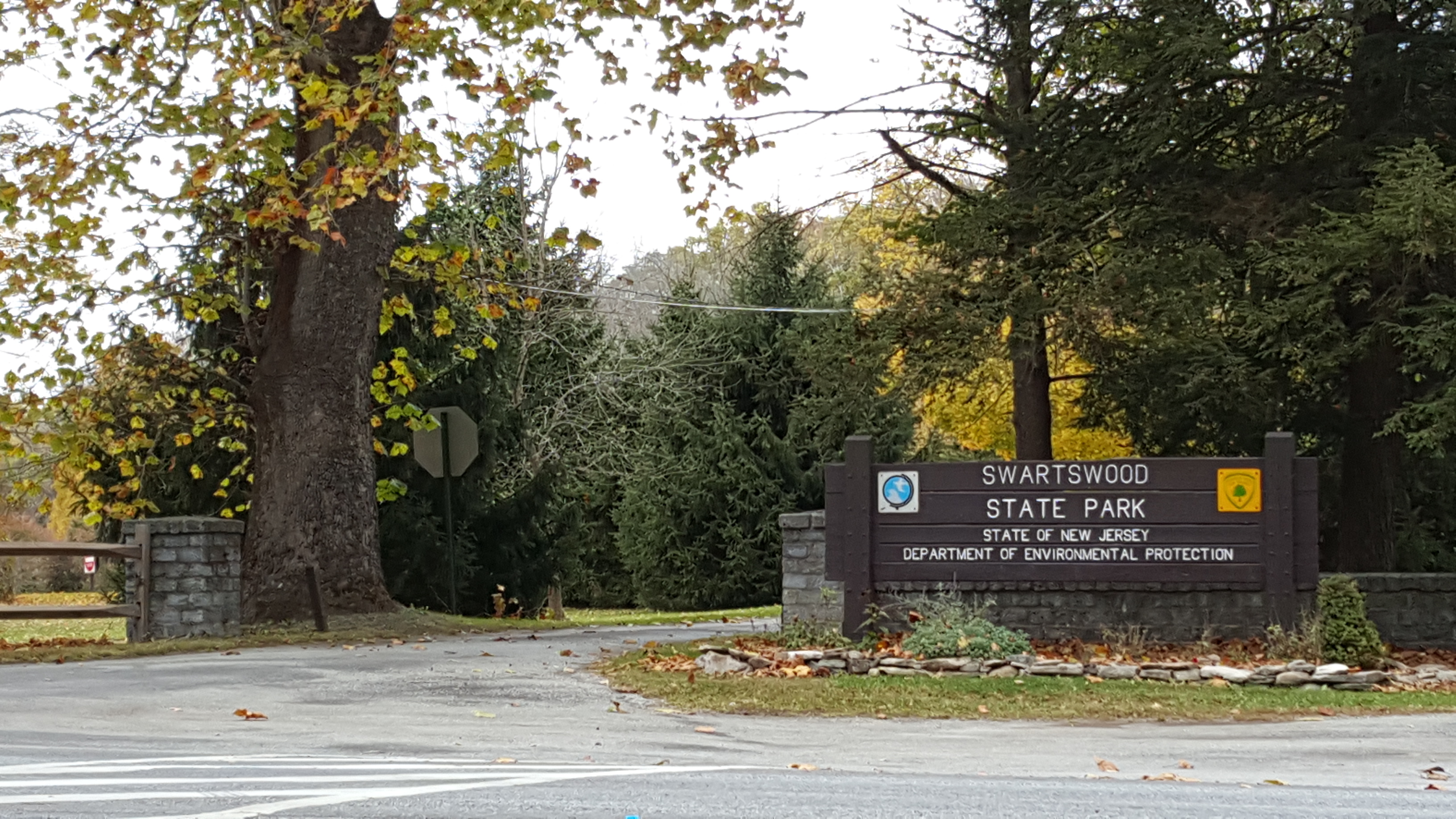
The entry gate on County Road 619

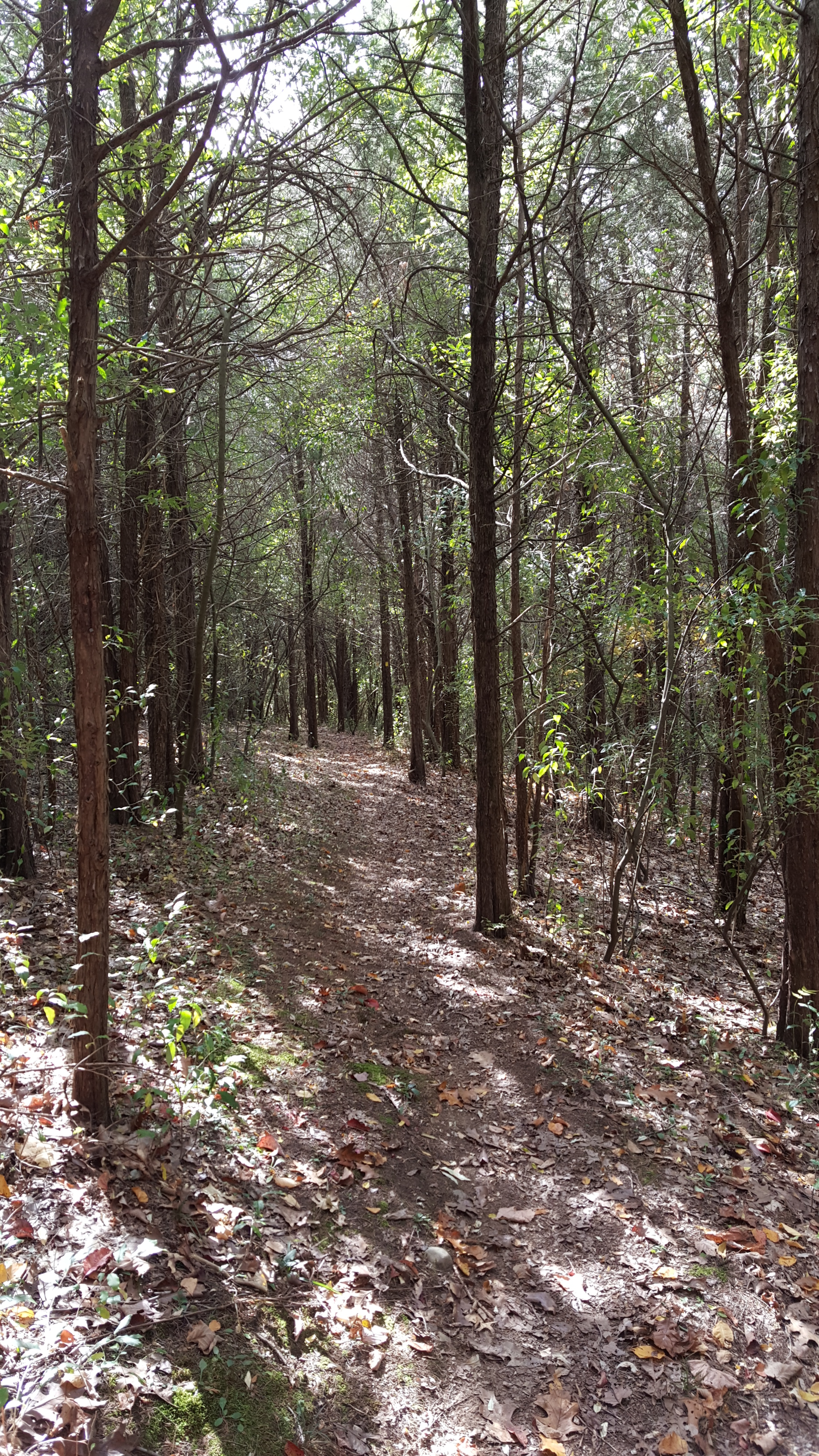
A stand of cedars

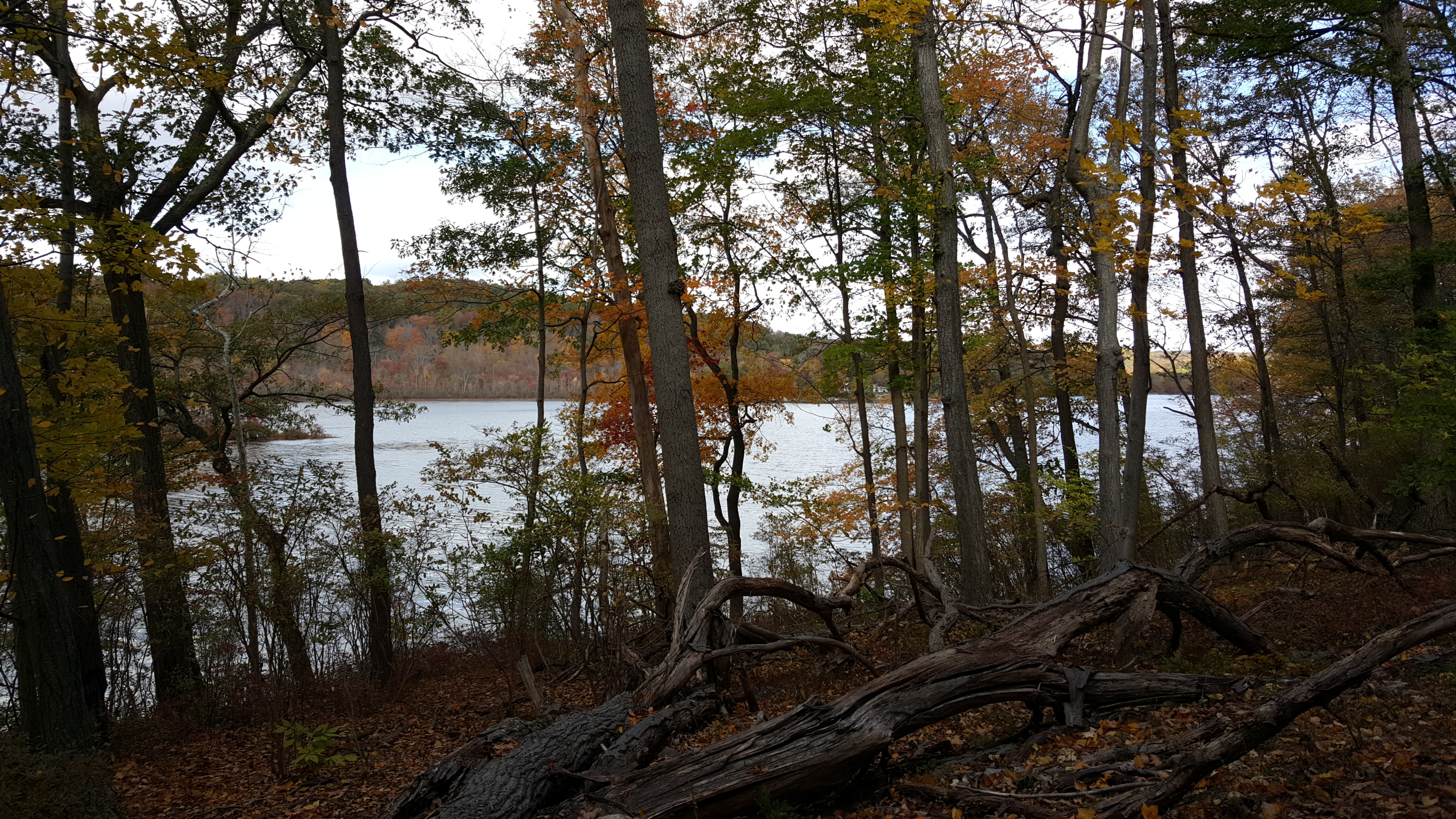
Swartswood Lake seen from the Grist Mill Trail

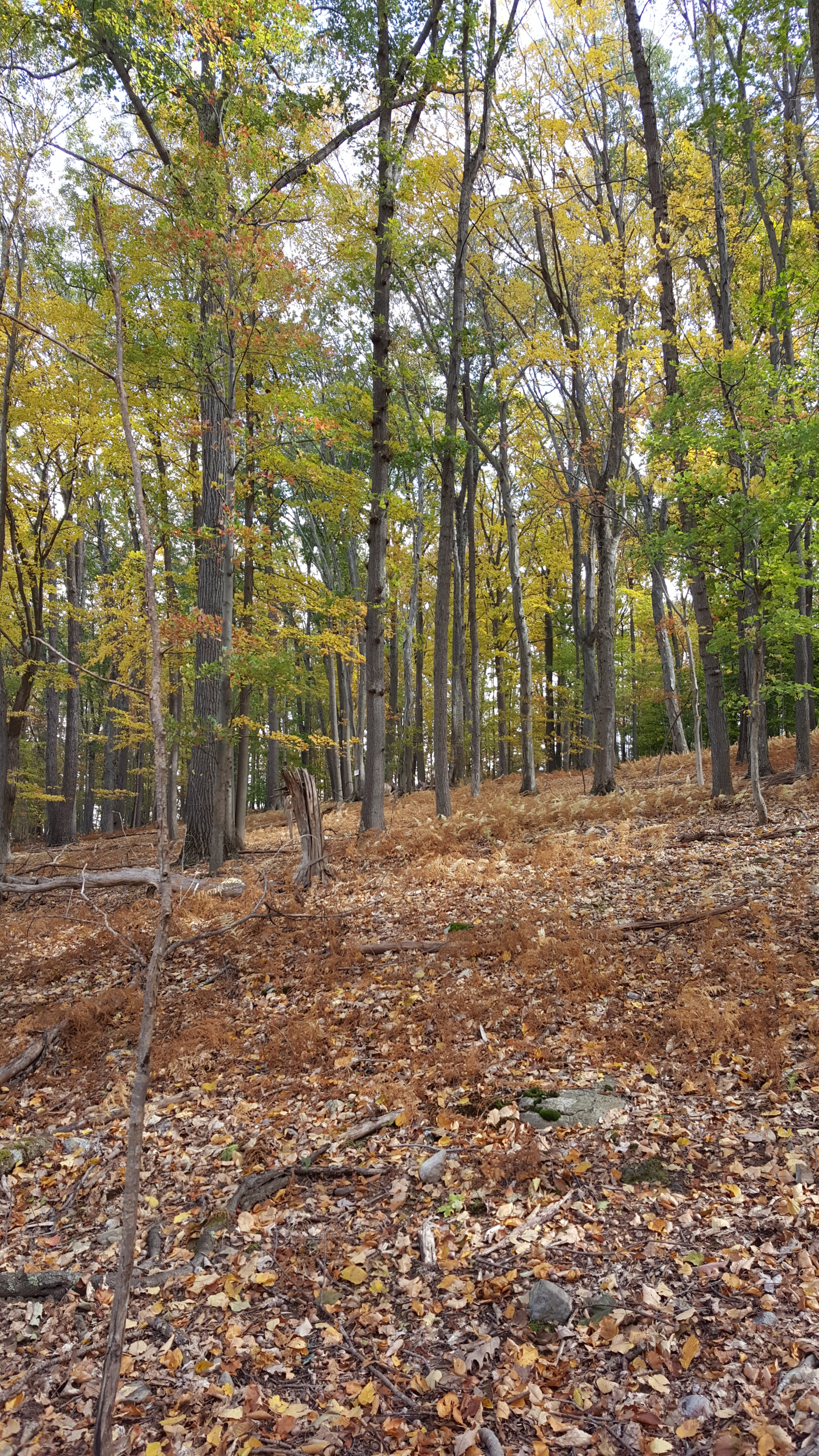
Hardwoods and withering cinnamon fern

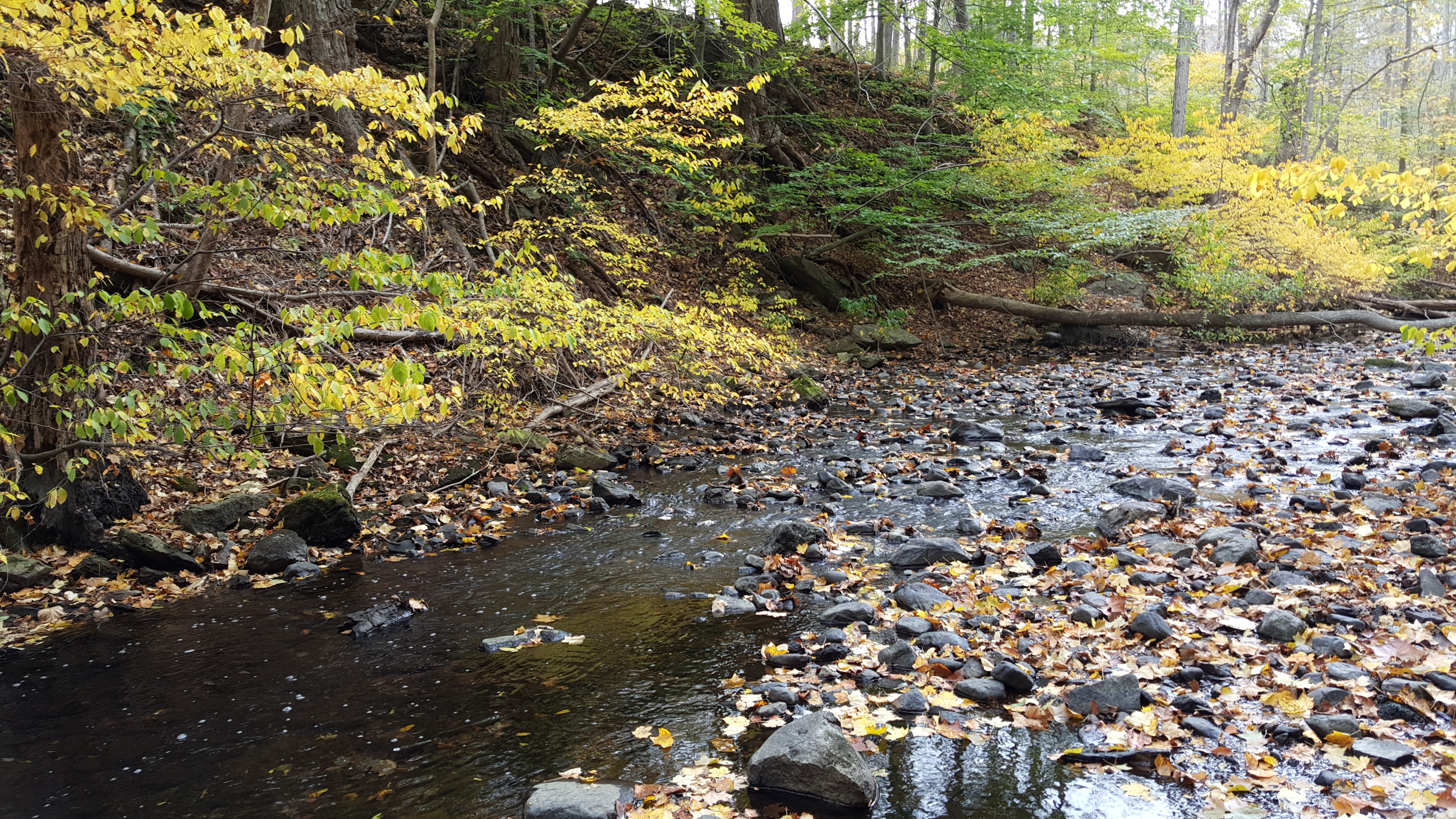
Keen's Mill Brook on the Grist Mill Trail

== See also ==
- List of New Jersey state parks
- List of New Jersey wildlife management areas
