= List of dam removals in New Jersey =

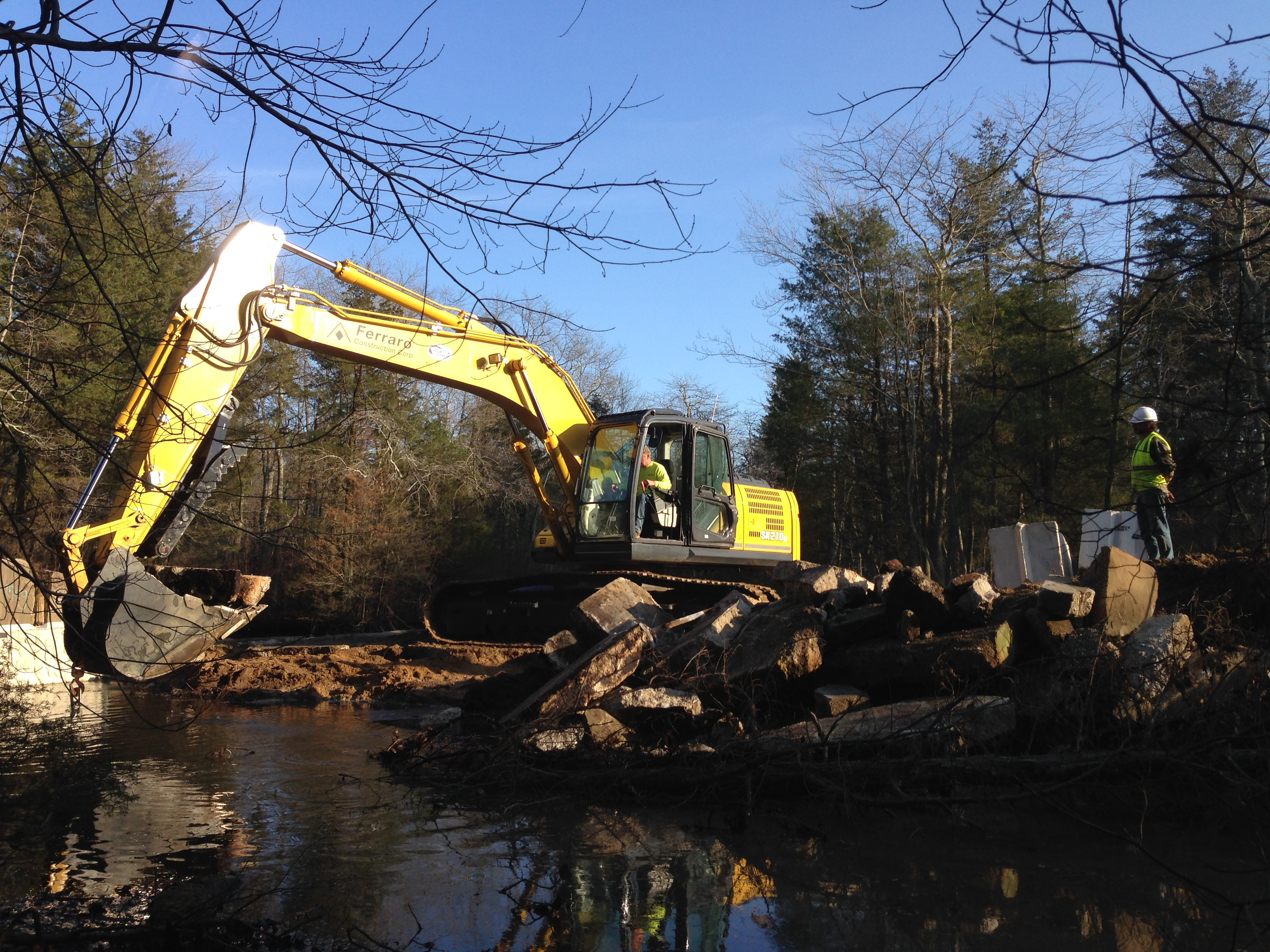
Removal of the Westecunk Creek Barrier from Westecunk Creek at the Edwin B. Forsythe National Wildlife Refuge in 2015.

This is a list of dams in New Jersey that have been removed as physical impediments to free-flowing rivers or streams.

== Removals by watershed ==
=== Delaware River ===
In 2021 two dams on Van Campens Brook, a tributary of the Delaware River, were removed as a principal part of the Watergate Wetlands Restoration Project within Delaware Water Gap National Recreation Area.

== Completed removals ==
Dam	Height	Year removed	Location	Watercourse	Watershed
Cedar Creek Weir	5 ft (1.5 m)	2014	Lacey Township; 39.8678°N 74.1689°W	Cedar Creek	Barnegat Bay
Kincaid Lake Dam	16 ft (4.9 m)	2018	Harrison Township; 39.7073°N 75.1902°W	Big Clems Run	Delaware River
Glenside Dam	12 ft (3.7 m)	1997	Blackwood; 39.7747°N 75.0539°W	Tributary to South Branch Big Timber Creek	Delaware River
Sooy Lake Dam	8 ft (2.4 m)	2013	Woodland Township; 39.8579°N 74.5975°W	Tributary to Burrs Mill Brook	Delaware River
Sterling Lake Dam	14.5 ft (4.4 m)	2011	Washington Township, Gloucester County; 39.7356°N 75.1106°W	Duffield Run	Delaware River
Camp Inawendiwin Lower Dam	11 ft (3.4 m)	2014	Tabernacle Township; 39.8693°N 74.6932°W	Friendship Creek	Delaware River
Stone's Dam	9 ft (2.7 m)	2013	Milford; 40.5752°N 75.0942°W	Hakihokake Creek	Delaware River
Gruendyke Mill Dam	7 ft (2.1 m)	2007	Hackettstown; 40.8488°N 74.8214°W	Musconetcong River	Delaware River
Seber Dam	4 ft (1.2 m)	2009	Hackettstown; 40.8532°N 74.812°W	Musconetcong River	Delaware River
Riegelsville Mill Dam	8 ft (2.4 m)	2011	Holland Township; 40.5983°N 75.177°W	Musconetcong River	Delaware River
Hughesville Dam	17 ft (5.2 m)	2016	Holland Township and Pohatcong Township; 40.63°N 75.1384°W	Musconetcong River	Delaware River
Finesville Dam	9 ft (2.7 m)	2011	Pohatcong Township; 40.606°N 75.1707°W	Musconetcong River	Delaware River
Columbia Lake Dam	18 ft (5.5 m)	2018	Knowlton Township; 40.9241°N 75.0873°W	Paulins Kill	Delaware River
County Line Dam	3 ft (0.91 m)	2022	Stillwater Township and Hardwick Township; 41.02°N 74.8868°W	Paulins Kill	Delaware River
Paulina Dam	13 ft (4.0 m)	2024	Blairstown; 40.977°N 74.944°W	Paulins Kill	Delaware River
Willever Lake Dam	9 ft (2.7 m)	2011	Mansfield Township, Warren County; 40.7927°N 74.9563°W	Pohatcong Creek	Delaware River
Warren Hills Regional School District Dam	12 ft (3.7 m)	2020	Washington Township, Warren County; 40.773°N 74.9998°W	Tributary to Pohatcong Creek	Delaware River
Lake Basgalore Dam	13 ft (4.0 m)	2018	Woolwich Township; 39.7351°N 75.2835°W	Tributary to Raccoon Creek	Delaware River
Father John's Lane Dam	10 ft (3.0 m)	2009	Lafayette Township; 41.0873°N 74.6708°W	Tributary to Paulins Kill	Delaware River
Middleville Dam	25 ft (7.6 m)	2009	Stillwater Township; 41.0575°N 74.8886°W	Tributary to Paulins Kill	Delaware River
Piraneo Lake Dam	10 ft (3.0 m)	2014	Andover; 40.9841°N 74.7373°W	Tributary to Pequest River	Delaware River
Pursel's Mill Dam	15 ft (4.6 m)	2006	Phillipsburg; 40.6772°N 75.17°W	Lopatcong Creek	Delaware River
Flower Hill Dam	10 ft (3.0 m)	2017	Hopewell Township, Mercer County; 40.2887°N 74.7799°W	Tributary to Shabakunk Creek	Delaware River
No. 10 Watergate Pond Dam	16 ft (4.9 m)	2021	Hardwick Township; 41.069°N 74.978°W	Van Campens Brook	Delaware River
No. 2 Watergate Pond Dam	9 ft (2.7 m)	2021	Hardwick Township; 41.069°N 74.972°W	Van Campens Brook	Delaware River
Upper Blue Mountain Dam	26 ft (7.9 m)	1995	Layton; 41.1039°N 74.9238°W	Tributary to Van Campens Brook	Delaware River
Pool Colony Dam		1999	Newton; 41.086°N 74.9304°W	Tributary to Van Campens Brook	Delaware River
Lake Success Dam	20 ft (6.1 m)	1995	Walpack Township; 41.1083°N 74.8899°W	Tributary to Van Campens Brook	
Lore's Mill Dam	8 ft (2.4 m)	2022	Commercial Township; 39.286°N 75.0632°W	Dividing Creek	Dividing Creek
Unexpected Road Dam	7.5 ft (2.3 m)	2014	Buena Vista Township; 39.566°N 74.9262°W	Tributary to Hospitality Branch	Great Egg Harbor River
New Jersey No Name # 125 Dam	8 ft (2.4 m)	2010	Hamilton Township, Atlantic County; 39.4813°N 74.7124°W	Race Branch	Great Egg Harbor River
New Jersey No Name # 126 Dam	7 ft (2.1 m)	2010	Hamilton Township, Atlantic County; 39.4817°N 74.7146°W	Race Branch	Great Egg Harbor River
Wrubel Swimming Pool Dam	8 ft (2.4 m)	2013	Demarest; 40.9453°N 73.9431°W	Cresskill Brook	Hackensack River
Westecunk Creek Barrier	8 ft (2.4 m)	2015	Edwin B. Forsythe National Wildlife Refuge; Eagleswood Township; 39.6414°N 74.3086°W	Westecunk Creek	Little Egg Harbor
Burnt Mills Dam	8 ft (2.4 m)	2019	Bedminster; 39.5323°N 75.0447°W	Burnt Mill Branch	Maurice River
Westor Dam	19 ft (5.8 m)	2016	Holmdel Township; 40.3398°N 74.187°W	Tributary to Willow Brook	Navesink River
Fullenkamp Dam	6.4 ft (2.0 m)	2011	Harding Township; 40.7658°N 74.5052°W	Catfish Brook	Passaic River
Patex Pond Dam	20 ft (6.1 m)	1990	Montville; 40.917°N 74.3827°W	Crooked Brook	Passaic River
Lake Hudsonia Dam	10 ft (3.0 m)	2021	Morris Township; 40.966°N 74.4964°W	Hibernia Brook	Passaic River
Cooke's Pond Dam	6.9 ft (2.1 m)	2010	Franklin Lakes Borough; 41.0299°N 74.1723°W	Tributary to Ho-Ho-Kus Brook	Passaic River
Lake Hartung Dam	10 ft (3.0 m)	2021	Jefferson Township; 41.041°N 74.5337°W	Russia Brook	Passaic River
Knox Hill Dam	18 ft (5.5 m)	1996	Morristown; 40.8067°N 74.5083°W	Tributary to Whippany River	Passaic River
Bodine Pond Dam	6 ft (1.8 m)	2011	Franklin Township, Hunterdon County; 40.5643°N 74.9361°W	Tributary to Capoolong Creek	Raritan River
Pottersville Dam	20 ft (6.1 m)	1985	Califon; 40.7226°N 74.7533°W	Cold Brook	Raritan River
Weston Mill Dam	5 ft (1.5 m)	2017	Manville and Franklin Township, Somerset County; 40.5302°N 74.588°W	Millstone River	Raritan River
Nevius Street Dam	2.45 ft (0.75 m)	2013	Raritan; 40.5648°N 74.6364°W	Raritan River	Raritan River
Roberts Street Dam	7.5 ft (2.3 m)	2012	Bridgewater Township; 40.5566°N 74.6486°W	Raritan River	Raritan River
Calco Dam	7 ft (2.1 m)	2011	Bridgewater Township; 40.5508°N 74.5519°W	Raritan River	Raritan River
Fieldsville Dam	10 ft (3.0 m)	1990	Somerset; 40.5409°N 74.5128°W	Raritan River	Raritan River
Sylvan Lake Dam		2012	Skillman; 40.4124°N 74.6957°W	Rock Brook	Raritan River
Camp Beisler Dam	17.1 ft (5.2 m)	2021	Lebanon Township; 40.7568°N 74.8641°W	Spruce Run	Raritan River
Jericho Pond Dam	5.5 ft (1.7 m)	2021	Stow Creek Township; 39.4707°N 75.3523°W	Stow Creek	Stow Creek
Kazmar Pond Dam	6 ft (1.8 m)	2017	Vernon Township; 41.2027°N 74.4088°W	Tributary to Wawayanda Creek	Wallkill River
