= Gene Hill =

American writer (1928–1997)

Gene Atkins Hill (May 15, 1928, in Swartswood, New Jersey – May 31, 1997, in Tucson, Arizona) is known for his contribution to nature-related magazines and his subsequent books.

Hill served in Okinawa during World War II. Upon graduation from Harvard, he worked as an advertising copywriter for several Madison Avenue agencies, including J. Walter Thompson.

At first, Hill moonlighted as an outdoors columnist for magazines including Guns & Ammo and Sports Afield. Then, in 1977, he left his day job to become a full-time columnist and associate editor at Field & Stream, where he also wrote the monthly column, "Hill Country". In his outdoor columns, and later in more than a dozen books, Hill wrote about his many outdoor pursuits. Many remember him for his stories of hunting dogs and our relations with them.

== Books ==
- A Hunter's Fireside Book (1972)
- Mostly Tailfeathers (1975)
- Hill Country (1978)
- A Gallery of Waterfowl and Upland Birds (1978)
- The Whispering Wings of Autumn (1981)
- Tears and Laughter (1981)
- Outdoor Yarns & Outright Lies (1983)
- A Listening Walk...and Other Stories (1985)
- Shotgunner's Notebook (1989)
- Sunlight & Shadows (1990)
- Just Mutts (1996)
- Passing a Good Time (1996)
