= Jacksonburg Creek =

Coordinates: 40.97927°N 74.98066°W

Jacksonburg Creek is a tributary of the Paulins Kill located along the eastern face of Kittatinny Mountain in Warren County in northwestern New Jersey in the United States. It rises near the Warren County-Sussex County border in Hardwick Township and enters the Paulins Kill in the center of Blairstown. The Appalachian Trail passes within its watershed and crosses the creek as it traverses the ridgeline of Kittatinny Mountain.

The 1980 slasher film Friday the 13th was filmed at Camp NoBeBosCo north of Blairstown, New Jersey in Hardwick Township. The camp's Sand Pond, which stood in for the movie's "Crystal Lake," is the headwaters of Jacksonburg Creek.

== See also ==
- List of rivers of New Jersey
