= Paulina, New Jersey =

Populated place in Warren County, New Jersey, US

- Unincorporated community
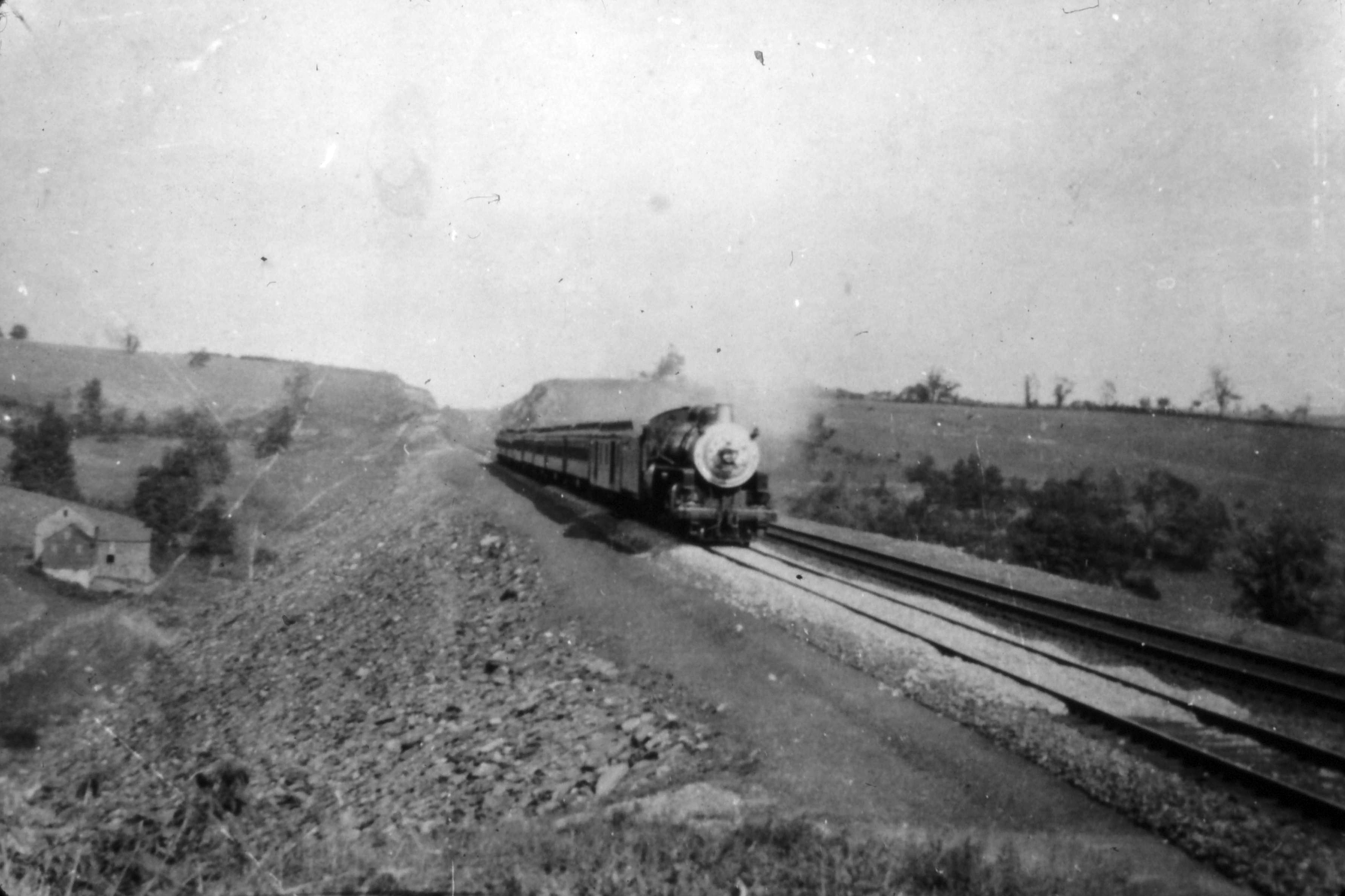
- The westbound Lackawanna Limited nears Paulina, circa 1912

- Location of Paulina in Warren County. Inset: Location of Warren County within the state of New Jersey Location within New Jersey Location with the United States
- Coordinates: 40°58′35″N 74°56′38″W
- Country: United States
- State: New Jersey
- County: Warren
- Township: Blairstown
- Elevation: 367 ft (112 m)
- Time zone: UTC−05:00 (Eastern (EST))
  - Summer (DST): UTC−04:00 (EDT)
- GNIS feature ID: 879172

Paulina is an unincorporated community located in Blairstown in Warren County, in the U.S. state of New Jersey.

Paulina is located on the Paulins Kill, approximately 1 mi (1.6 km) east of downtown Blairstown.

== History ==
Around 1768, William Armstrong constructed a grist mill there, which remained for more than a century. A second grist mill was constructed in Paulina in 1783 by Peter B. Shafer. That mill was later used as an axe-helve factory and saw mill.

By 1851, Paulina had a post office, and by 1882 the population was 110. In 1890, a grist mill was still located there.

In 1895, the Paulina Dam, also known as the Paulina Lake Dam, was built on the Paulins Kill. Rated a "significant hazard" by the New Jersey Department of Environmental Protection, the process of removing it started in December 2023. The removal was completed in 2024.

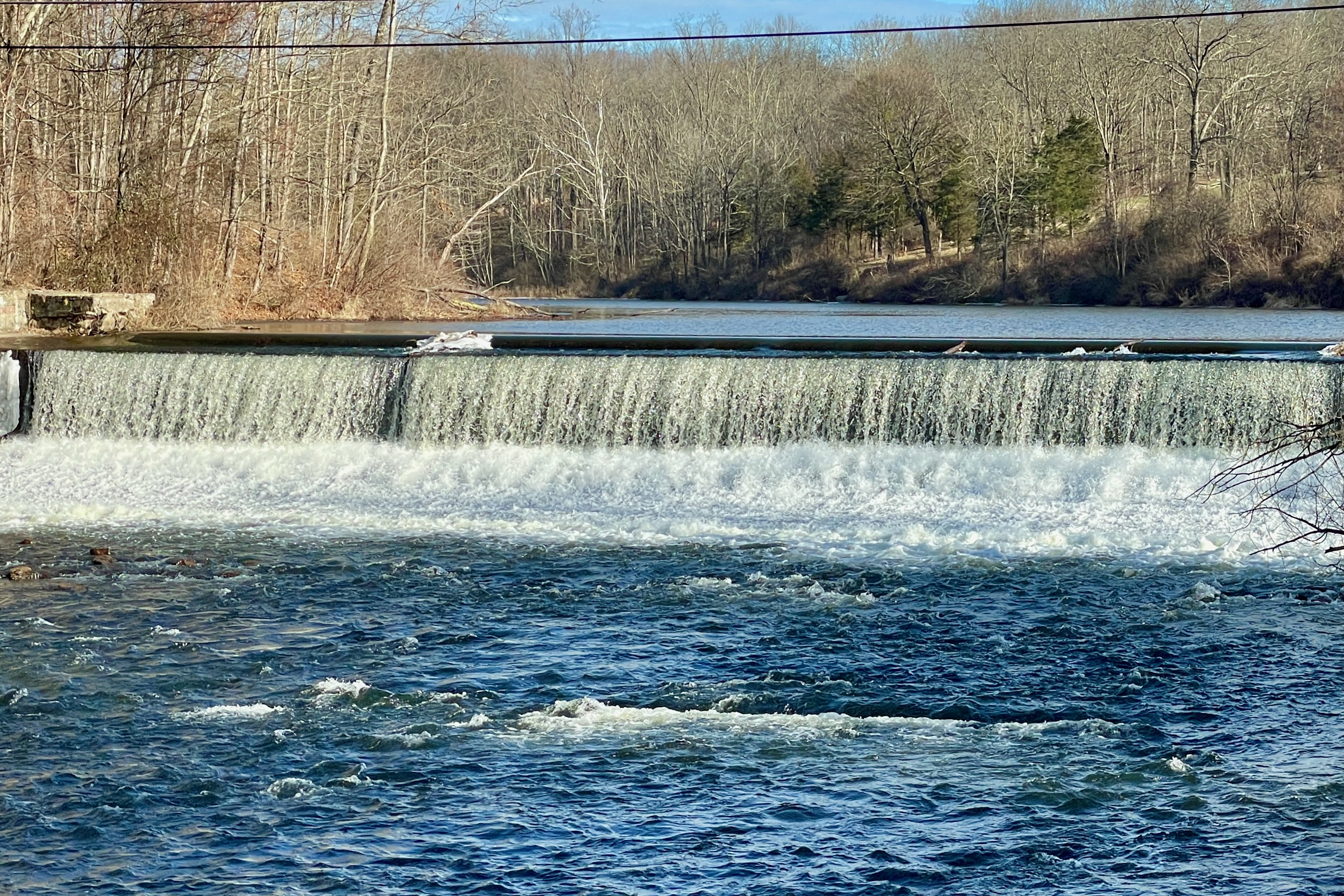
Paulina Dam in December 2022

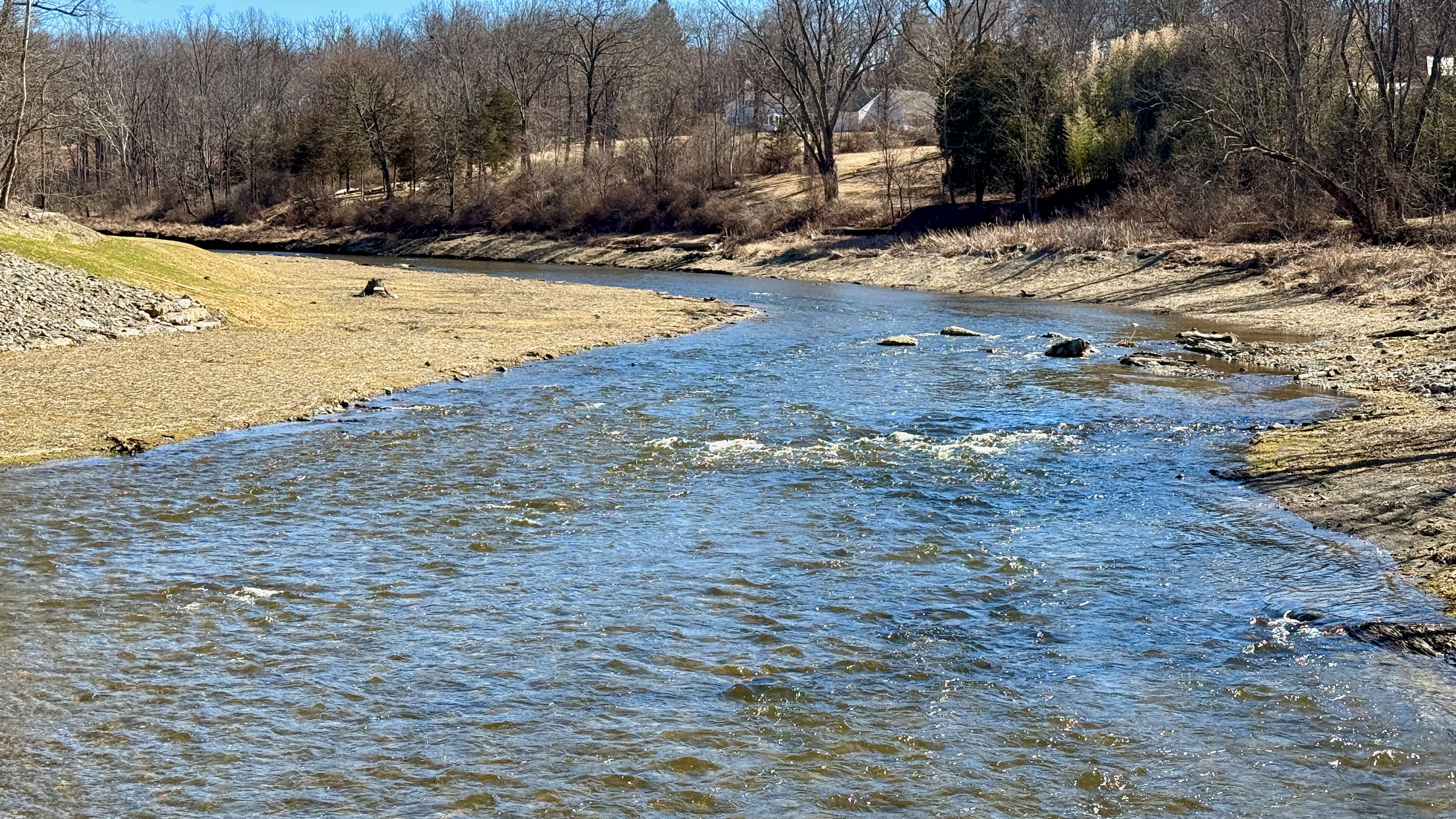
Free-flowing Paulins Kill at the site in March 2025

== Today ==
The Paulinskill Valley Trail, a 30-mile (48 km) long recreational rail trail following the former route of the New York, Susquehanna and Western Railway, passes through Paulina.

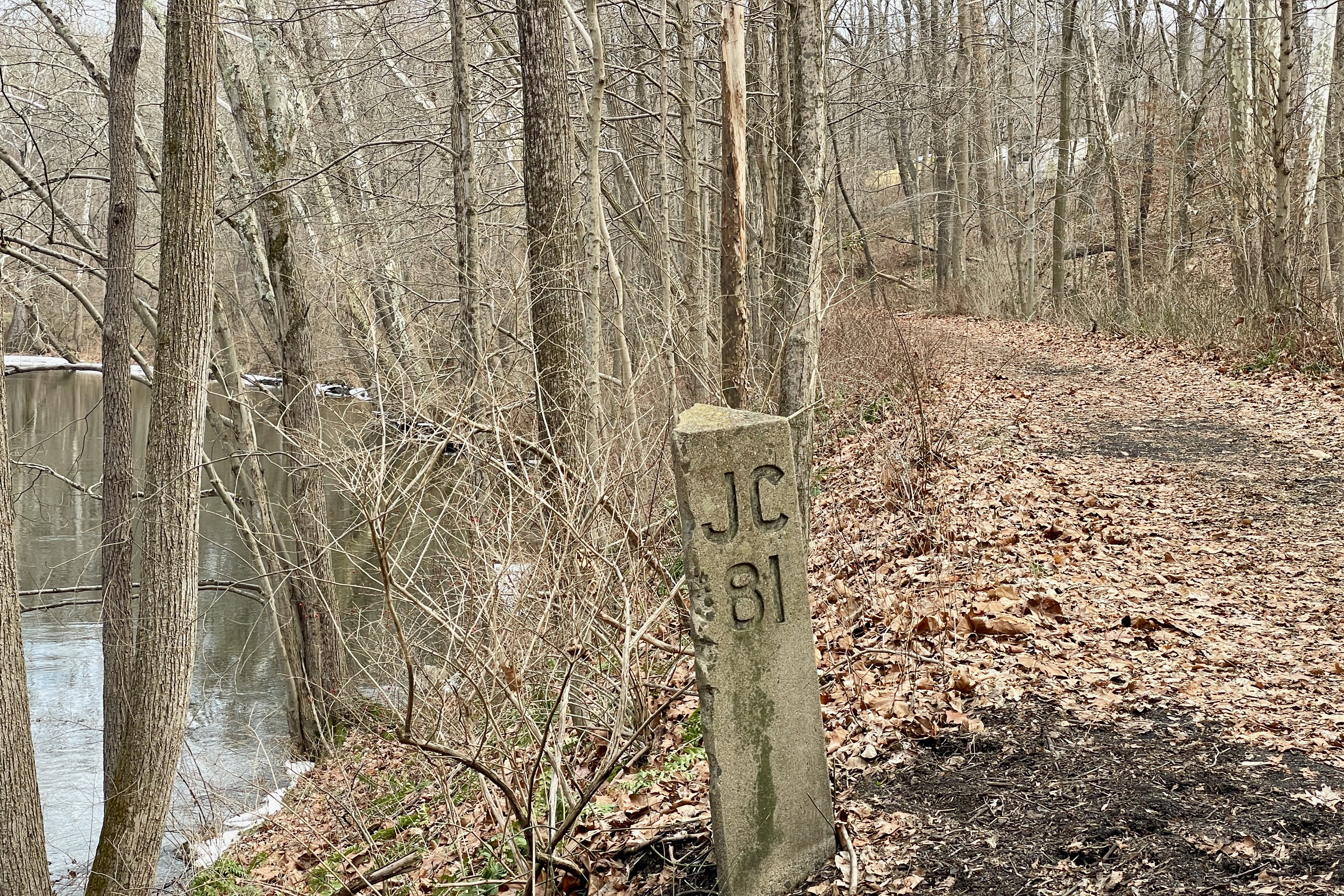
Paulinskill Valley Trail along the Paulins Kill near Paulina
