= Swartswood, New Jersey =

Populated place in Sussex County, New Jersey, US

- Unincorporated community
- Swartswood's location in Sussex County (Inset: Sussex County in New Jersey) Swartswood, New Jersey (New Jersey) Swartswood, New Jersey (the United States)
- Coordinates: 41°05′13″N 74°49′38″W
- Country: United States
- State: New Jersey
- County: Sussex
- Townships: Hampton and Stillwater
- Elevation: 525 ft (160 m)
- Time zone: UTC−05:00 (Eastern (EST))
  - Summer (DST): UTC−04:00 (EDT)
- ZIP Code: 07877
- Area codes: 862 & 973
- GNIS feature ID: 881044

Swartswood is an unincorporated community located on the border of Hampton and Stillwater townships in Sussex County, in the U.S. state of New Jersey. Swartswood is 4.4 miles (7.1 km) west-northwest of Newton. Swartswood has a post office with ZIP Code 07877.

== Notable people ==
- Gene Hill (1928–1997), writer
