= Blairstown =

Blairstown may refer to a place in the United States:

- Blairstown, Iowa
- Blairstown, Louisiana
- Blairstown, Missouri
- Blairstown, New Jersey, a township
  - Blairstown (CDP), New Jersey, a census-designated place within the township
  - Blairstown Airport
  - Blairstown Historic District
  - Blairstown station, a railway station
