= Kinlaw =

Kinlaw is a surname. Notable people with the surname include:

- Dennis F. Kinlaw (1922–2017), theologian
- Javon Kinlaw (born 1997), American football defensive tackle
- Michael Kinlaw (born 1973), American mortgage broker and politician
- Reggie Kinlaw (born 1957), American football defensive tackle
- Rodney Kinlaw (born 1985), American football running back
- Arthur and Donna Kinlaw, suspects in the murder of Dawn Olanick, previously the unidentified "Princess Doe"

== See also ==
- Kinilaw, a Filipino raw seafood dish
