= Blairstown Railway =

Former U.S. railway line in New Jersey

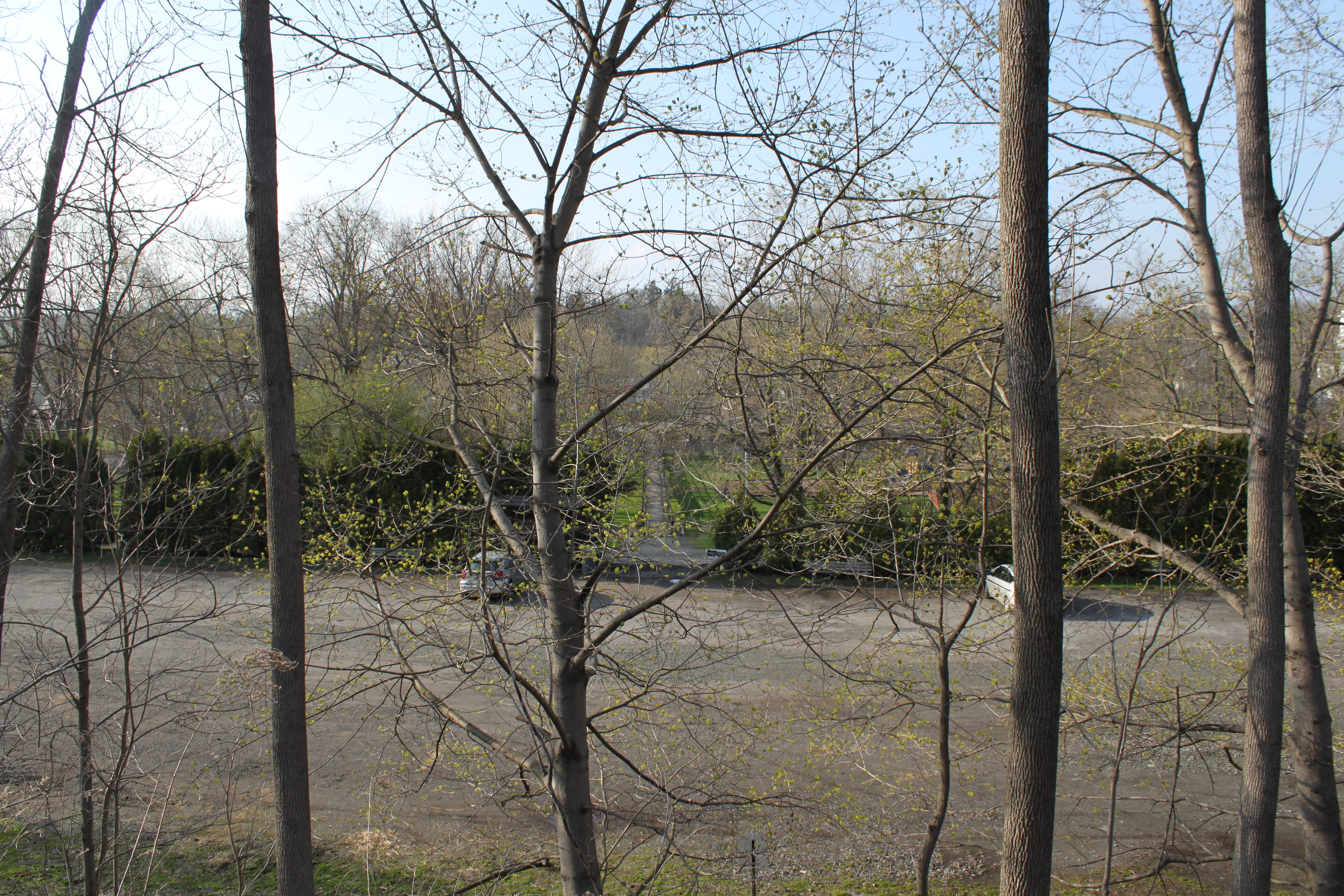
A wide-angle view of Footbridge Park in Blairstown, New Jersey from 2011, the starting point of the Blairstown Railway, shows the footbridge into the town of Blairstown (center), the location of the coal docks and skate park (left), the former location of the station (right) and the location of the former rail yard which occupied what is now a parking lot (foreground). This location is a common starting point for hikers and bicyclists using the Paulinskill Valley Trail.

The Blairstown Railway (BRWY) opened in 1877 and ran between Blairstown and Delaware, New Jersey, a distance of approximately 12 miles (19 km). The single-track railroad was built under the direction of railroad magnate John I. Blair, one of the wealthiest persons in the United States at that time, who had previously built the Warren Railroad, and for whom Blairstown is named.

== History ==
The Blairstown Railway started at what is now Footbridge Park in Blairstown and ended at the Lackawanna Railroad's station, which was located between Clinton and Clarence Streets in Delaware NJ. The BRWY itself never grew beyond its initial size. Legend has it that Blair built the BRWY so that his wife to be able to travel from their home in Blairstown to New York City and back in one day for shopping. Although such a tale is plausible, and serves to give Blair a more human side than he is often given credit for, it would have been completely out of character for the notoriously frugal Blair to have built what would have amounted to an extravagant toy for the occasional use of his seventy-five-year-old wife.

Rather, it is far more likely that Blair was aware that there were railroads — specifically, the New York, Susquehanna & Western Railroad and the Lehigh and New England Railroad — who were surveying routes through the Blairstown area into Pennsylvania and who might want to use his BRWY as part of their route if he built it before they could. Indeed, given the topography of the Blairstown area, and Blair's penchant for being at least one step ahead of the competition (and ideally holding the trump card too), Blair's strategy was probably to build the BRWY, and wait.

Blair would only have to wait four years (1881) before the New Jersey Midland Railroad extended its tracks from Sparta, New Jersey to connect to the BRWY, and through trains began plying the rails of the BRW. Later, the New York, Susquehanna & Western Railroad (NYS&W), a corporate successor of the New Jersey Midland RR, and the Lehigh & New England Railroad (L&NE), a competitor that also needed Blair's route (via trackage rights), would turn Blair's bucolic branchline into a somewhat bustling mainline, albeit for two relatively small players in the railroad arena.

Clearly, if it had been Blair's intent that the entire BRWY would be used by another railroad to connect to the Lackawanna Railroad at Delaware, he was mistaken. For the L&NE would use only about six miles of the BRWY (to Hainesburg Junction) and the NYS&W about nine miles (to a point called Columbia Junction, located about where Interstate 80 crosses Columbia Lake today), with the remainder of the route to Delaware being run as a vestigal branchline. But, perhaps this was Blair's plan all along. Blair would die in 1899 at the age of 97. A dozen years after Blair's death, in 1911, Blairstown would receive a second train station, located about a mile or so up the hill from Blair's station. This one, however, would be located on the Lackawanna Cut-Off.

As such, the Hainesburg-Delaware section south of Hainesburg Junction − the so-called Delaware Branch − would be abandoned in 1928. The L&NE went out of business in 1961, resulting in the tracks west of Hainesburg Junction being removed. In 1963, the NYS&W removed the tracks from Sparta Junction to Blairstown. And, in the late 1980s, the abandoned rail right-of-way between Sparta Junction and Knowlton Township, New Jersey would become the Paulinskill Valley Trail.

== Remains ==
The train station in Blairstown was located in what is now Footbridge Park. The parking lot for the park was originally a small railyard, complete with passing sidings, a turntable and engine house, and a coaling dock that is still extant (for a while in later years, a skate park was located under the old coaling dock). The footbridge across the Paulinskill River was the second one at the site. The present footbridge was dedicated by Blair himself shortly before his death, and provided direct access between the town of Blairstown and the train station, and later to Footbridge Park.

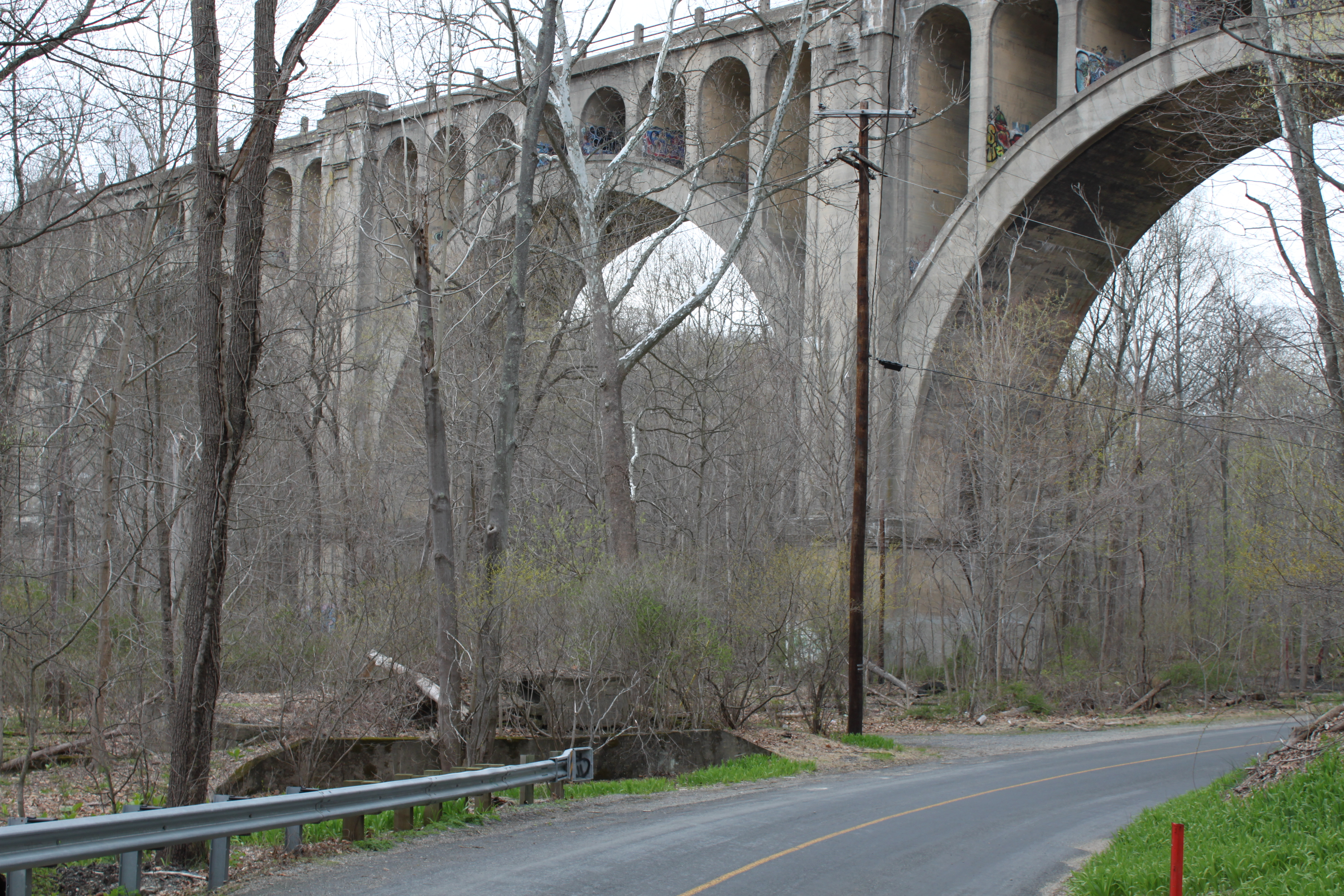
The Blairstown Railway ran adjacent to the opposite side of Station Road in Hainesburg, New Jersey, under the easternmost arch of the Paulins Kill Viaduct on the Lackawanna Cut-Off, as shown in this April 2011 photo. There was no connecting track between the Blairstown Railway and the Lackawanna Cut-Off. Hainesburg Station, on what was the New York, Susquehanna & Western Railroad, was located directly under the viaduct. The remains of the freight station's foundation can clearly be seen in the left-center of the photo. The tracks on the Blairstown Railway were removed from this location in 1963.

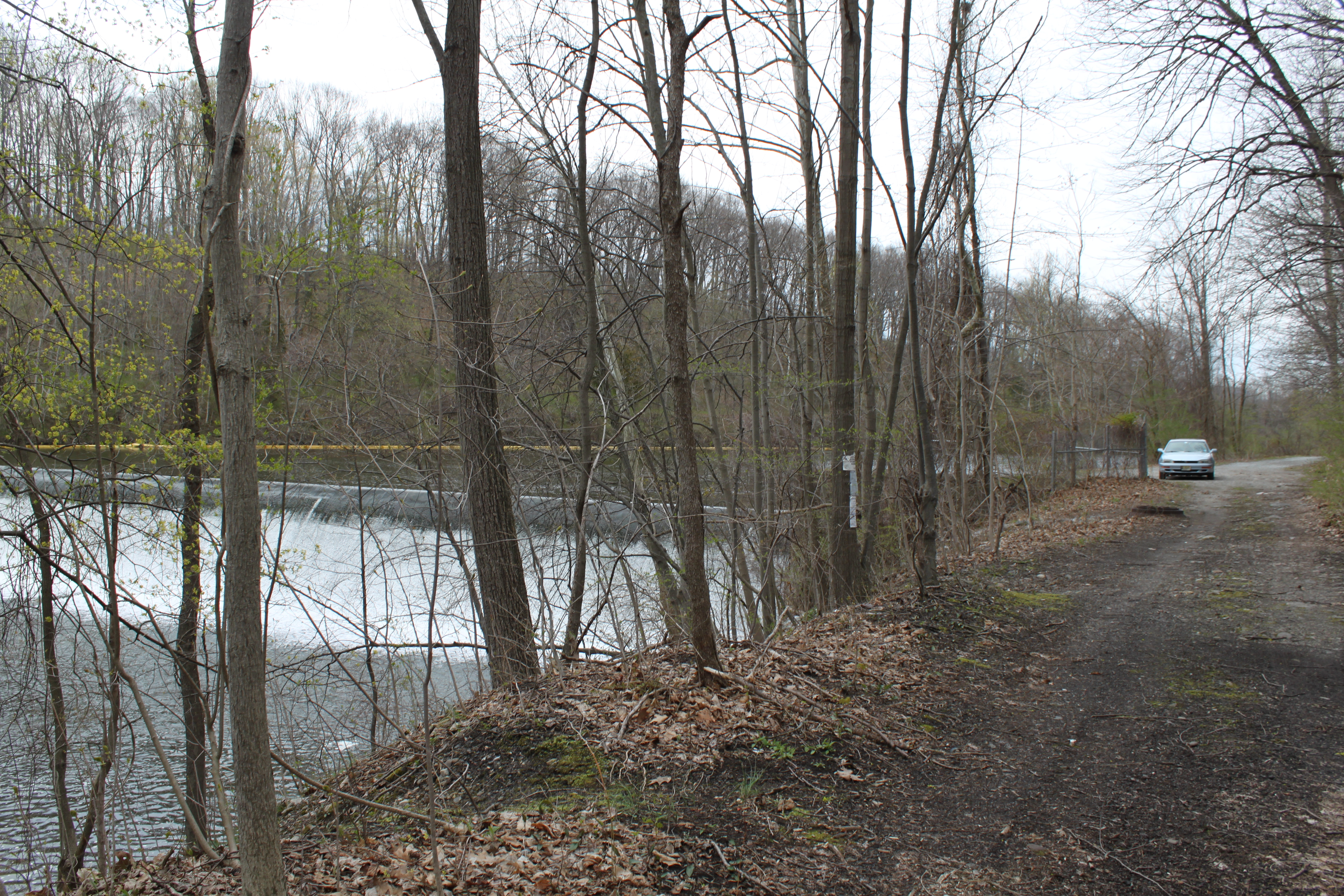
The Blairstown Railway right-of-way where it passes the Columbia Power Dam near the town of Columbia, New Jersey.

Most of the route of the Blairstown Railway, from Blairstown southwest to Delaware, can still be traced today, although parts of the route have ceased to exist. Indeed, the right-of-way from Footbridge Park to Blairstown Airport is still fully intact as the Paulinskill Valley Trail. However, the right-of-way has been severed by the airport, with signage pointing the direction to where the trail continues south of the airport. The trail runs another three miles from there, passing under the Paulins Kill Viaduct, continuing until it passes under Interstate 80, in an unusual pipe tunnel, and then ends near the power dam on the Paulinskill River near Columbia, New Jersey.

From there, the old right-of-way can no longer be followed, as it continues only a short distance, and then dead ends on private property. After that, the right-of-way has been mostly obliterated by the widening of U.S. Route 46, traveling along the eastern shore of the Delaware River until the town of Delaware is reached. In Delaware, until 2012, a remaining vestige of the BRW was a short, deep cut high into the steep rock wall on the southern outskirts of town along US Route 46. The western wall of the cut was removed that year to provide a parking lot for Gary Gray Trucking. The rather odd position of the cut is explained by Blair's apparent desire to have his railroad end at, rather than across the tracks from, Delaware Station. Another vestige is the partially filled turntable pit of the BRW, located alongside Delaware Road, just northeast of the village. The Lackawanna Railroad's railroad station in Delaware was torn down in 1968 and the tracks of the old Warren Railroad were removed from the location in 1970.

== Sources ==
- Susquehanna - New York, Susquehanna & Western RR, by John Krause and Ed Crist, Carstens Publications, 1980.
- Interstate Commerce Commission Reports: Decisions of the Interstate Commerce Commission of the United States. Valuation reports, Volume 33 Interstate Commerce Commission, U.S. Government Printing Office, 1931 Wikipedia:WikiProject Trains/ICC valuations/New York, Susquehanna and Western Railroad
