= BRW =

BRW may refer to:

== Transport ==
- Blairstown Railway, New Jersey, U.S.
- Black River and Western Railroad, New Jersey, U.S.
- Brunswick railway station, Liverpool, England
- Wiley Post–Will Rogers Memorial Airport, Alaska, U.S.

== Other uses ==
- BRW (magazine), a defunct Australian business periodical
  - BRW Rich 200, its annual rich list
- Black and red ware, ancient pottery of South Asia
