= Paulinskill Valley Trail =

Rail trail in New Jersey, United States

Coordinates: 41°00′49″N 74°52′51″W

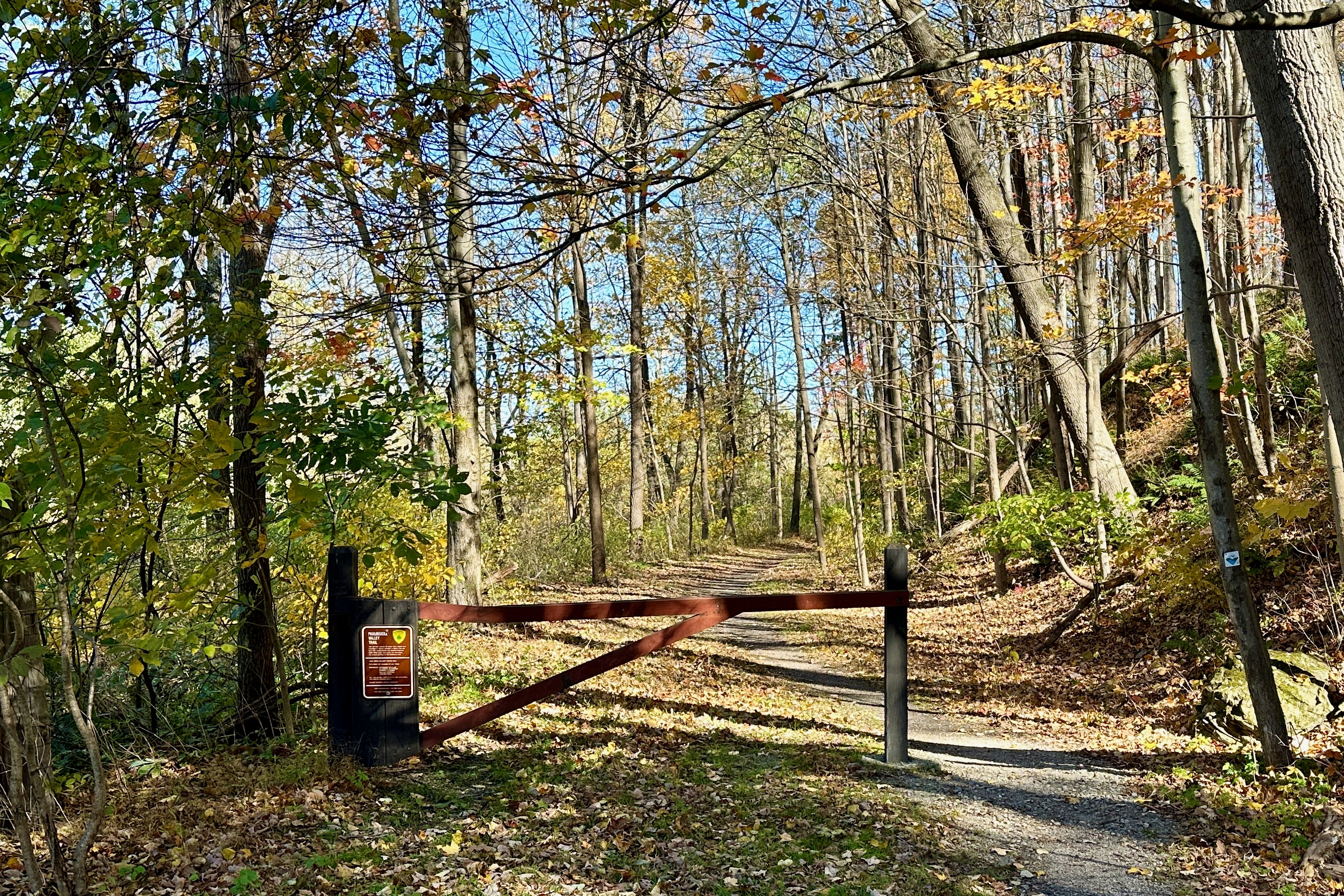
- Trail access from Station Road in Hainesburg, New Jersey
- Length: 27 mi (43 km)
- Location: Sussex / Warren counties, New Jersey, USA
- Trailheads: Stillwater, Warbasse Junction, Sparta Junction
- Use: Hiking, horseback riding, cross country skiing, and mountain biking
- Difficulty: Easy
- Season: Year-round
- Surface: Ballast, dirt, cinder
- Right of way: New York, Susquehanna and Western Railway

The Paulinskill Valley Trail is a rail trail along the Paulins Kill in New Jersey. It is the sixth longest trail in the state at 27 miles (43 km). It was originally the mainline right-of-way of the New York, Susquehanna and Western Railroad and the predecessor Blairstown Railway which was later purchased by the Susquehanna.

== Description ==
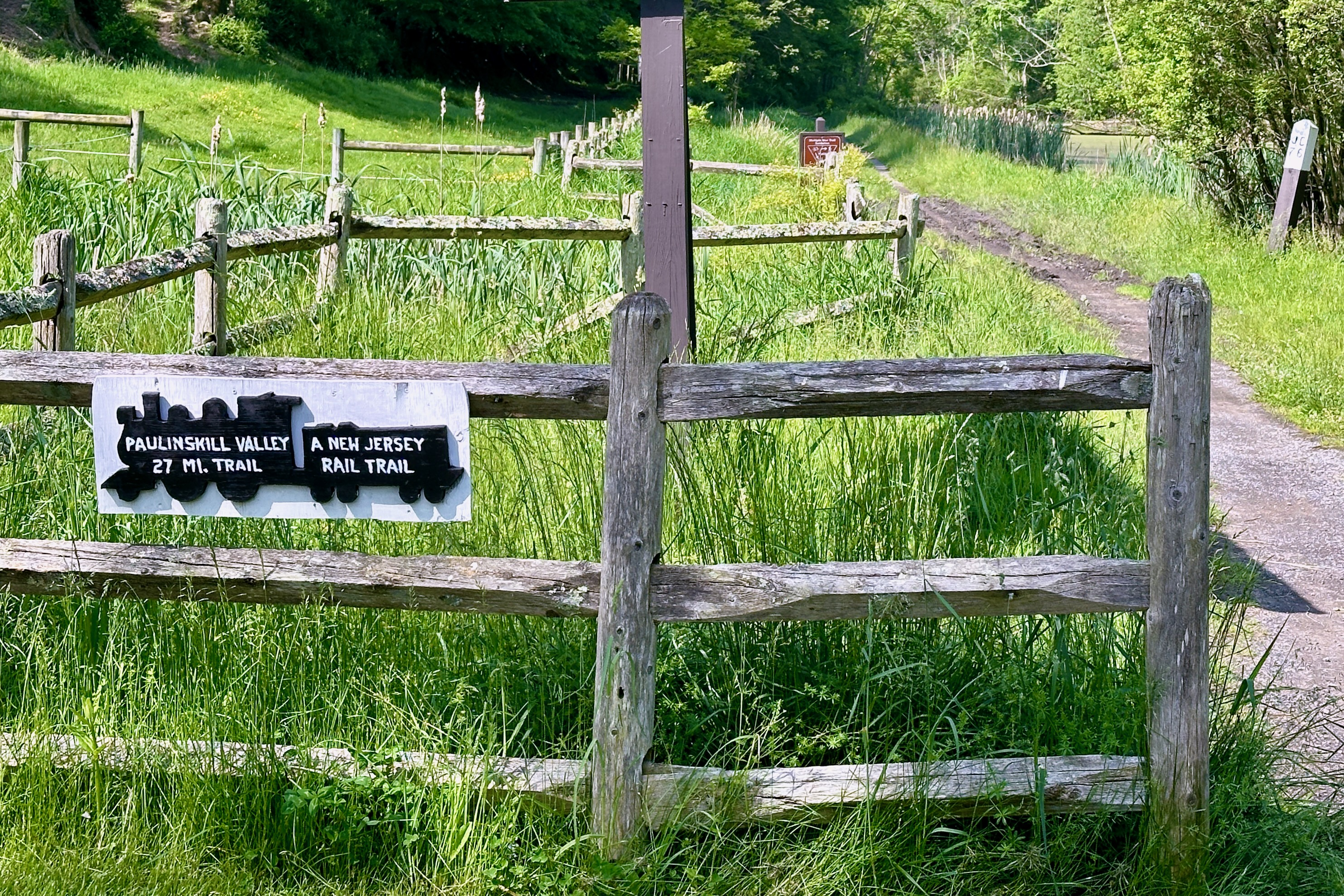
Trail sign at the Cedar Ridge Road trailhead

Vestiges of the railroad remain including several bridges, stations, mileage markers, telegraph poles and other railway artifacts like buildings both still standing and ruined. There are also numerous benches and signs explaining the history of the trail and what remains of the railroad. Over 200 species of birds have been sighted on the trail as well as a multitude of other wildlife.

The Paulinskill Valley Trail intersects the Sussex Branch Trail at Warbasse Junction just north of Newton. as well as the 3.5-mile Great Valley Rail Trail, along Paulins Kill Lake.

The trail is frequented by hikers, bicyclists, joggers and people who are just out for a stroll. Horseback riding is also permitted. Access is denied to motor vehicles, however, although trailheads typically provide some modest amount of parking. Although the trail is generally well-maintained from the Paulinskill Viaduct north, south of that location the quality of the trail is somewhat uneven. Over the years there have been surprisingly few encroachments onto the right-of-way. The most notable encroachment is at Blairstown Airport where the trail ceases to exist for about a half-mile (1 km). Signage directs the hiker to where the trail continues.

== History ==
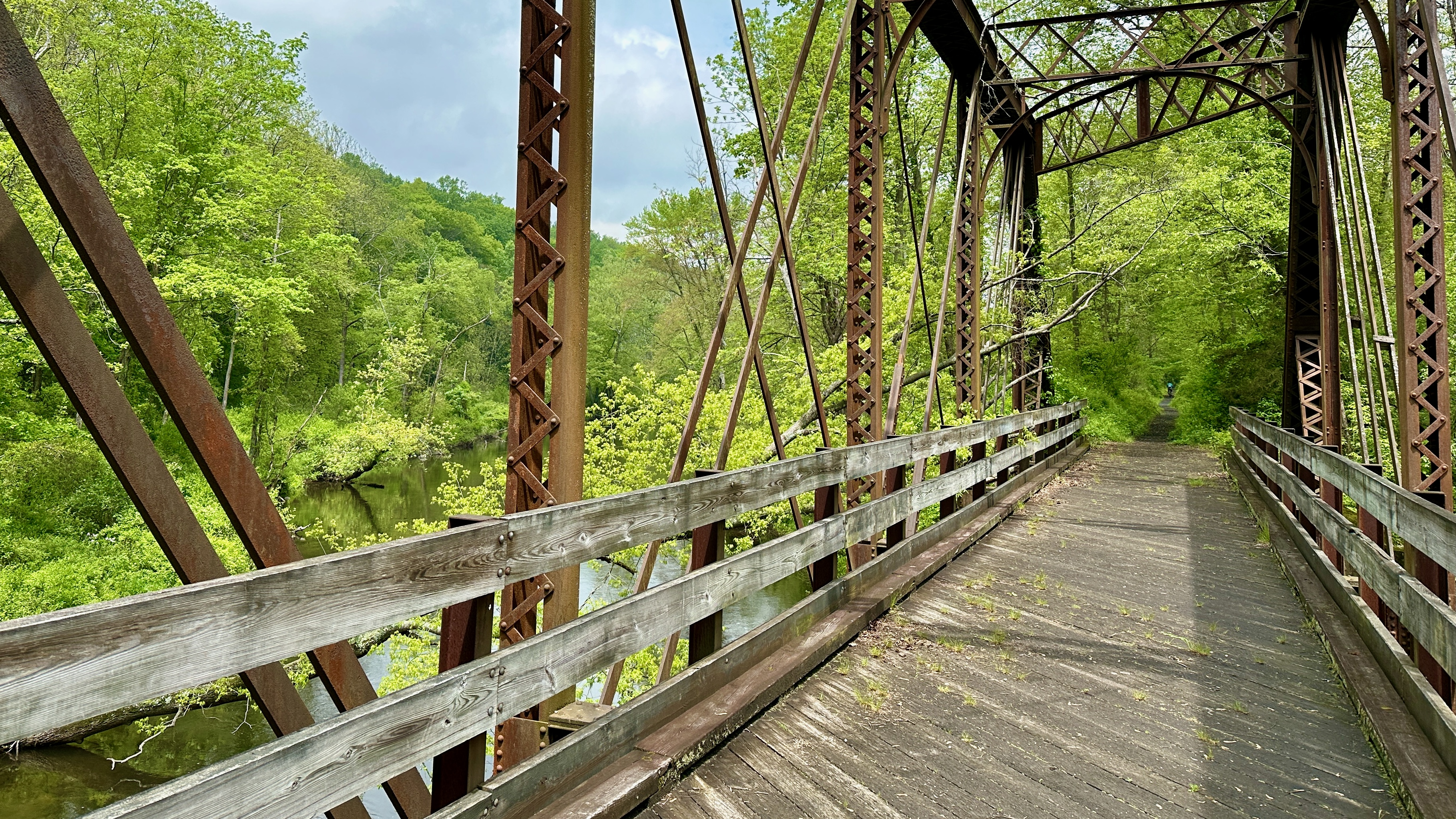
Trail crossing the Paulins Kill on former NYSW railroad bridge 78.9

In 1886, the New York, Susquehanna and Western Railroad built the first part of the railway tracks that is now the trail. In 1962, the railroad ceased its operations on this line, and the tracks were removed. In 1985, the New Jersey Department of Environmental Protection organized a meeting in Blairstown to decide what should be done with the intention of buying the land. A year later, in 1986, the NJDEP bought the land.

== Bibliography ==
- Schmitt, James C. (2009). Historic Rails of the New York, Susquehanna & Western Railroad. West Milford, New Jersey: Tinfoil Rose Design, LLC. ISBN 9780615313849.
- Lucas, Walter Arndt (1980) [1939]. The History of the New York, Susquehanna and Western Railroad (second ed.). Railroadians of America. LCCN 82163920.
- "Paulinskill Valley Trail - New Jersey Trails". TrailLink.
- "Paulinskill Valley Rail Trail". sussexskylands.com. Sussex County Chamber of Commerce.
- "Paulinskill & Sussex Branch Trails – Liberty Gap". Liberty Gap Roofing.
- "Kittatinny Valley State Park and Paulinskill Valley Trail". Skylands Visitor.
