= Blairstown, New Jersey =

Township in Warren County, New Jersey, US

- Township
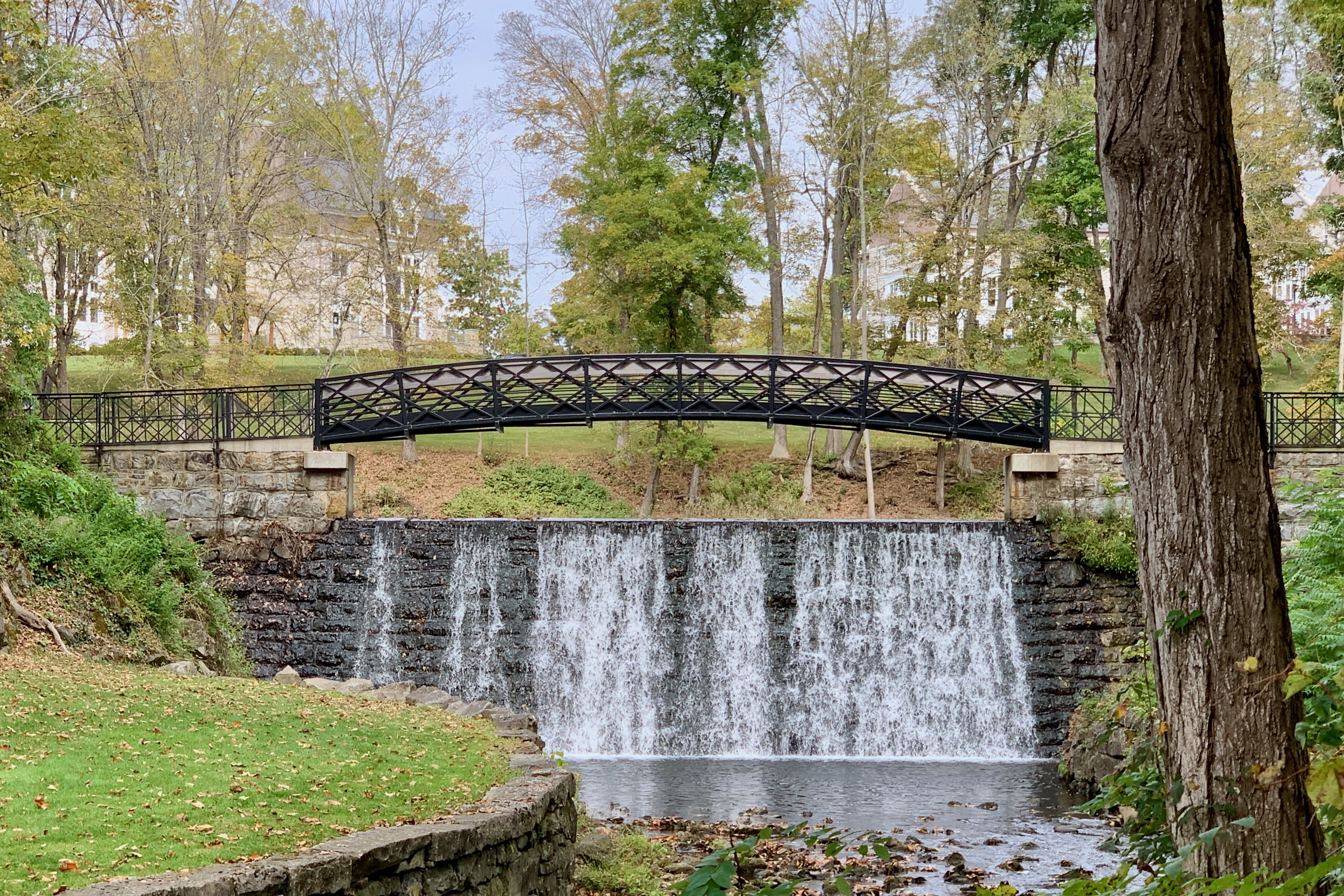
- Blair Lake Spillway and Footbridge in October 2020

- Seal

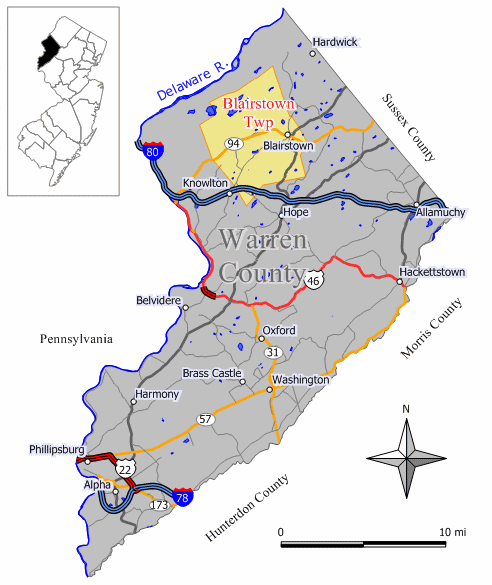
- Location of Blairstown Township in Warren County highlighted in yellow (right). Inset map: Location of Warren County in New Jersey highlighted in black (left).

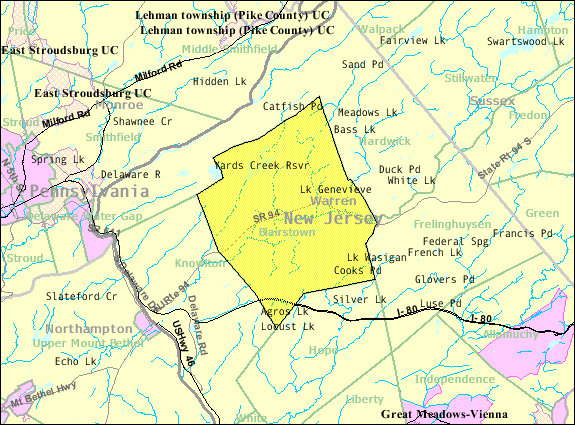
- Census Bureau map of Blairstown, New Jersey

- Location in Warren County Location in New Jersey Location in the United States
- Coordinates: 40.980156°N 74.996849°W
- Country: United States
- State: New Jersey
- County: Warren
- Incorporated: April 14, 1845
- Named for: John Insley Blair

Government
  - Type: Township
  - Body: Township Committee
  - Mayor: Rob Moorhead (R, term ends December 31, 2023)
  - Municipal clerk-Administrator: Kristin Shipps

Area
  - Total: 30.78 sq mi (79.71 km^{2})
  - Land: 29.89 sq mi (77.41 km^{2})
  - Water: 0.89 sq mi (2.30 km^{2}) 2.88%
  - Rank: 87th of 565 in state 2nd of 22 in county
- Elevation: 364 ft (111 m)

Population (2020)
  - Total: 5,704
  - Estimate (2023): 5,757
  - Rank: 360th of 565 in state 7th of 22 in county
  - Density: 190.9/sq mi (73.7/km^{2})
  - Rank: 507th of 565 in state 15th of 22 in county
- Time zone: UTC−05:00 (Eastern (EST))
  - Summer (DST): UTC−04:00 (Eastern (EDT))
- ZIP Code: 07825
- Area code: 908
- FIPS code: 3404106160
- GNIS feature ID: 0882317
- Website: www.blairstowntownship.org

Blairstown is a township in Warren County, in the U.S. state of New Jersey. As of the 2020 United States census, the township's population was 5,704, a decrease of 263 (−4.4%) from the 2010 census count of 5,967, which in turn reflected an increase of 220 (+3.8%) from the 5,747 counted in the 2000 census.

The area had been known as Smith's Mill and was later called Butts Bridge (variously spelled as "Butt's Bridge" and "Butts' Bridge"), named for a family that owned the eponymous crossing of the Paulins Kill.

Blairstown was incorporated as a township by an act of the New Jersey Legislature on April 14, 1845, from portions of Knowlton Township, based on the results of a referendum held that day. The township was named for John Insley Blair.

== Geography ==
According to the U.S. Census Bureau, the township had a total area of 30.78 square miles (79.71 km^{2}), including 29.89 square miles (77.41 km^{2}) of land and 0.89 square miles (2.30 km^{2}) of water (2.88%). The township is located in the Kittatinny Valley which is a section of the Great Appalachian Valley that stretches for 700 miles (1,100 km) from Canada to Alabama.

Blairstown CDP (with a 2020 Census population of 493) is an unincorporated community and census-designated place (CDP) located within the township. A portion of Hainesburg (with a 2020 Census population of 422), which is primarily located in Knowlton Township, falls within Blairstown's borders.

Other unincorporated communities, localities and place names located partially or completely within the township include Blair Lake, Cedar Lake, Cooks Pond, Jacksonburg, Kalarama, Lake Susquehanna, Mount Vernon, Paulina, Vail and Walnut Valley.

White Township borders the Warren County municipalities of Frelinghuysen Township, Hardwick Township, Hope Township and Knowlton Township.

== Demographics ==
Historical population
Census	Pop.	Note	%±
1850	1,405		—
1860	1,542		9.8%
1870	1,379		−10.6%
1880	1,458		5.7%
1890	1,662		14.0%
1900	1,576		−5.2%
1910	1,718		9.0%
1920	1,361		−20.8%
1930	1,416		4.0%
1940	1,449		2.3%
1950	1,571		8.4%
1960	1,797		14.4%
1970	2,189		21.8%
1980	4,360		99.2%
1990	5,331		22.3%
2000	5,747		7.8%
2010	5,967		3.8%
2020	5,704		−4.4%
2023 (est.)	5,757	▲	0.9%
Population sources: 1850–1920; 1850–1870 1850 1870; 1880–1890 1890–1910; 1910–1930 1940–2000; 2000 2010 2020

The township's economic data and that of Warren County is calculated by the U.S. Census Bureau as part of the Allentown-Bethlehem-Easton, PA-NJ Metropolitan Statistical Area, which also includes Carbon, Lehigh, and Northampton counties in eastern and northeastern Pennsylvania.

=== 2010 census ===
The 2010 United States census counted 5,967 people, 2,124 households, and 1,703 families in the township. The population density was 193.6 per square mile (74.7/km^{2}). There were 2,272 housing units at an average density of 73.7 per square mile (28.5/km^{2}). The racial makeup was 96.03% (5,730) White, 1.12% (67) Black or African American, 0.12% (7) Native American, 1.14% (68) Asian, 0.00% (0) Pacific Islander, 0.45% (27) from other races, and 1.14% (68) from two or more races. Hispanic or Latino of any race were 3.79% (226) of the population.

Of the 2,124 households, 32.8% had children under the age of 18; 66.8% were married couples living together; 9.4% had a female householder with no husband present and 19.8% were non-families. Of all households, 15.8% were made up of individuals and 6.3% had someone living alone who was 65 years of age or older. The average household size was 2.78 and the average family size was 3.11.

23.9% of the population were under the age of 18, 7.2% from 18 to 24, 20.1% from 25 to 44, 33.3% from 45 to 64, and 15.5% who were 65 years of age or older. The median age was 44.3 years. For every 100 females, the population had 99.4 males. For every 100 females ages 18 and older there were 96.8 males.

The Census Bureau's 2006–2010 American Community Survey showed that (in 2010 inflation-adjusted dollars) median household income was $82,952 (with a margin of error of +/− $10,269) and the median family income was $92,063 (+/− $14,594). Males had a median income of $73,818 (+/− $7,161) versus $54,959 (+/− $13,254) for females. The per capita income for the borough was $38,393 (+/− $7,342). About 4.1% of families and 5.0% of the population were below the poverty line, including 8.1% of those under age 18 and 1.4% of those age 65 or over.

=== 2000 census ===
As of the 2000 United States census, there were 5,747 people, 2,040 households, and 1,638 families residing in the township. The population density was 185.3 inhabitants per square mile (71.5/km^{2}). There were 2,136 housing units at an average density of 68.9 per square mile (26.6/km^{2}). The racial makeup of the township was 98.17% White, 0.26% African American, 0.14% Native American, 0.56% Asian, 0.02% Pacific Islander, 0.28% from other races, and 0.57% from two or more races. Hispanic or Latino of any race were 1.98% of the population.

There were 2,040 households, out of which 35.0% had children under the age of 18 living with them, 69.6% were married couples living together, 7.3% had a female householder with no husband present, and 19.7% were non-families. 15.3% of all households were made up of individuals, and 7.1% had someone living alone who was 65 years of age or older. The average household size was 2.81 and the average family size was 3.14.

In the township the population was spread out, with 25.6% under the age of 18, 5.8% from 18 to 24, 26.7% from 25 to 44, 29.5% from 45 to 64, and 12.4% who were 65 years of age or older. The median age was 40 years. For every 100 females, there were 99.5 males. For every 100 females age 18 and over, there were 96.2 males.

The median income for a household in the township was $64,809, and the median income for a family was $71,214. Males had a median income of $51,931 versus $33,646 for females. The per capita income for the township was $27,775. About 3.0% of families and 4.5% of the population were below the poverty line, including 2.4% of those under age 18 and 3.4% of those age 65 or over.

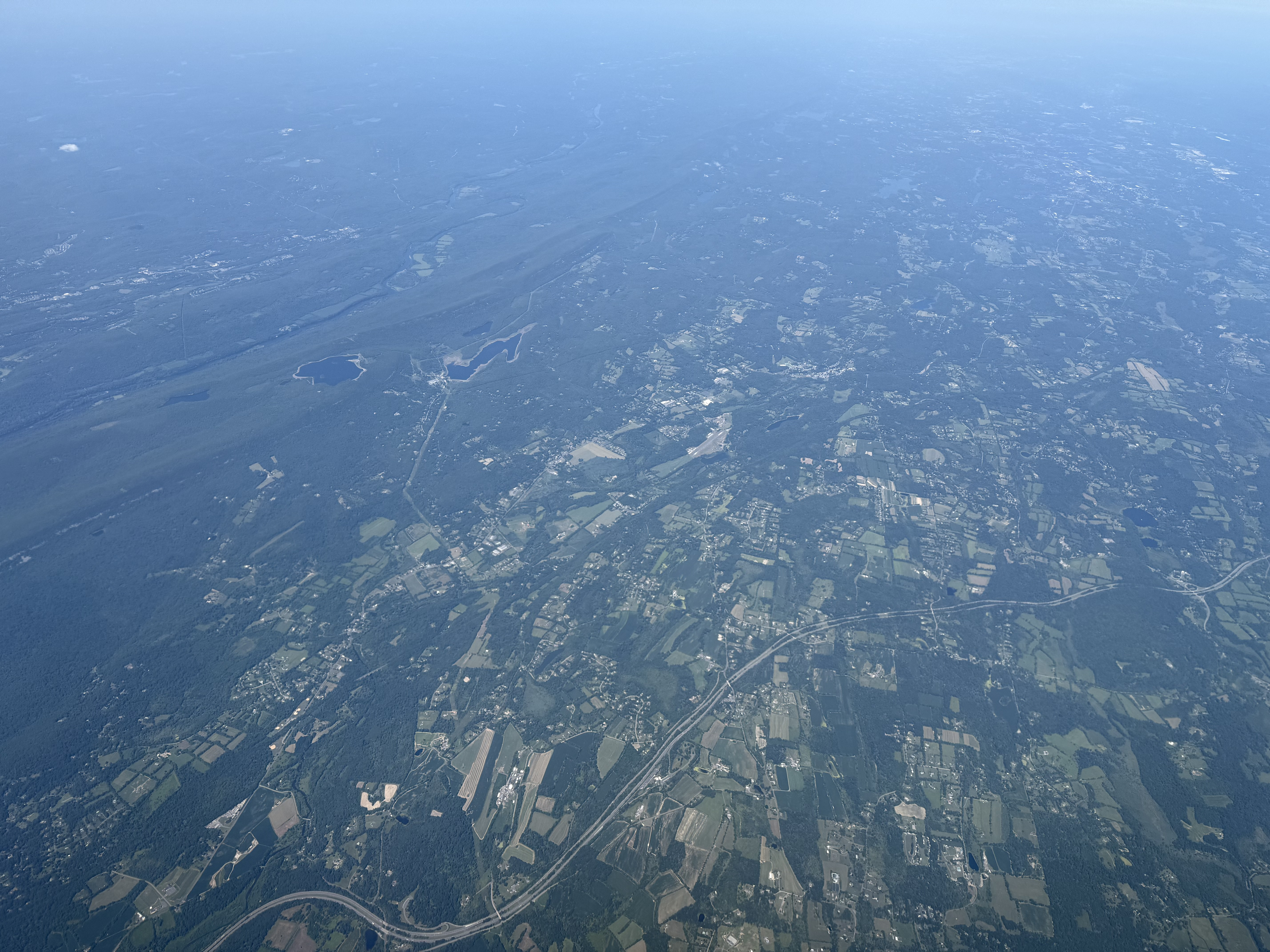
Aerial view centered on Blairstown

== Government ==
=== Local government ===
Blairstown is governed under the Township form of New Jersey municipal government, one of 141 municipalities (of the 564) statewide that use this form, the second-most commonly used form of government in the state. The Township Committee is composed of five members, who are elected directly by the voters at-large in partisan elections to serve three-year terms of office on a staggered basis, with either one or two seats coming up for election each year as part of the November general election in a three-year cycle. At a reorganization meeting held each year during the first week of January, the Committee members select one of their members to serve as Mayor and another to serve as Deputy Mayor.

As of 2025, the Blairstown Township Committee is comprised of Mayor Rob Moorhead (R, term on committee ends December 31, 2027, term as mayor ends 2025), Deputy Mayor Walter Orcutt (R, term on committee ends 2026; term as deputy mayor ends 2025), Karen Lance (R, 2025), G. Eric Lohman (R, 2026) and Giovanna "JoAnne" VanValkenburg (R, 2027).

=== Federal, state, and county representation ===
Blairstown Township is located in the 7th Congressional District and is part of New Jersey's 23rd state legislative district.

For the 119th United States Congress, New Jersey's 7th congressional district is represented by Thomas Kean Jr. (R, Westfield). New Jersey is represented in the United States Senate by Democrats Cory Booker (Newark, term ends 2027) and Andy Kim (Moorestown, term ends 2031).

For the 2026–2027 session, the 23rd legislative district of the New Jersey Legislature is represented in the State Senate by Doug Steinhardt (R, Lopatcong Township) and in the General Assembly by John DiMaio (R, Hackettstown) and Erik Peterson (R, Franklin Township).

Warren County is governed by a three-member Board of County Commissioners, who are chosen at-large on a staggered basis in partisan elections with one seat coming up for election each year as part of the November general election. At an annual reorganization meeting held in the beginning of January, the board selects one of its members to serve as Commissioner Director and other as Deputy Director. As of 2025, Warren County's Commissioners are:

Deputy Director Jason J. Sarnoski (R, Lopatcong Township; 2025), Lori Ciesla (R, Lopatcong Township; 2026), and Director James R. Kern III (R, Pohatcong Township; 2027).

Constitutional officers of Warren County are: Clerk Holly Mackey (R, Alpha; 2027), Sheriff James McDonald Sr. (R, Phillipsburg; 2025) and Surrogate Michael J. Doherty (R, Washington; 2025).

=== Politics ===
As of March 2011, there were a total of 4,294 registered voters in Blairstown Township, of which 707 (16.5% vs. 21.5% countywide) were registered as Democrats, 1,882 (43.8% vs. 35.3%) were registered as Republicans and 1,702 (39.6% vs. 43.1%) were registered as Unaffiliated. There were 3 voters registered as Libertarians or Greens. Among the township's 2010 Census population, 72.0% (vs. 62.3% in Warren County) were registered to vote, including 94.6% of those ages 18 and over (vs. 81.5% countywide).

Gubernatorial election results for Blairstown
Year	Republican		Democratic		Third party(ies)	
Year	No.	%	No.	%	No.	%
2025	1,796	62.53%	1,065	37.08%	11	0.38%
2021	1,550	68.80%	673	29.87%	30	1.33%
2017	1,090	62.00%	589	33.50%	79	4.49%
2013	1,335	74.00%	427	23.67%	42	2.33%
2009	1,252	64.07%	498	25.49%	204	10.44%
2005	1,340	62.47%	692	32.26%	113	5.27%

In the 2012 presidential election, Republican Mitt Romney received 1,654 votes (63.2% vs. 56.0% countywide), ahead of Democrat Barack Obama with 910 votes (34.8% vs. 40.8%) and other candidates with 28 votes (1.1% vs. 1.7%), among the 2,616 ballots cast by the township's 4,326 registered voters, for a turnout of 60.5% (vs. 66.7% in Warren County). In the 2008 presidential election, Republican John McCain received 1,986 votes (60.7% vs. 55.2% countywide), ahead of Democrat Barack Obama with 1,192 votes (36.4% vs. 41.4%) and other candidates with 39 votes (1.2% vs. 1.6%), among the 3,271 ballots cast by the township's 4,332 registered voters, for a turnout of 75.5% (vs. 73.4% in Warren County). In the 2004 presidential election, Republican George W. Bush received 2,141 votes (65.8% vs. 61.0% countywide), ahead of Democrat John Kerry with 1,068 votes (32.8% vs. 37.2%) and other candidates with 33 votes (1.0% vs. 1.3%), among the 3,256 ballots cast by the township's 4,021 registered voters, for a turnout of 81.0% (vs. 76.3% in the whole county).

United States presidential election results for Blairstown
Year	Republican		Democratic		Third party(ies)	
Year	No.	%	No.	%	No.	%
2024	2,313	63.86%	1,255	34.65%	54	1.49%
2020	2,269	61.71%	1,355	36.85%	53	1.44%
2016	1,978	64.66%	967	31.61%	114	3.73%
2012	1,654	63.81%	910	35.11%	28	1.08%
2008	1,986	61.73%	1,192	37.05%	39	1.21%
2004	2,141	66.04%	1,068	32.94%	33	1.02%

In the 2013 gubernatorial election, Republican Chris Christie received 74.0% of the vote (1,335 cast), ahead of Democrat Barbara Buono with 23.7% (427 votes), and other candidates with 2.3% (42 votes), among the 1,850 ballots cast by the township's 4,338 registered voters (46 ballots were spoiled), for a turnout of 42.6%. In the 2009 gubernatorial election, Republican Chris Christie received 1,252 votes (63.5% vs. 61.3% countywide), ahead of Democrat Jon Corzine with 489 votes (24.8% vs. 25.7%), Independent Chris Daggett with 180 votes (9.1% vs. 9.8%) and other candidates with 24 votes (1.2% vs. 1.5%), among the 1,971 ballots cast by the township's 4,236 registered voters, yielding a 46.5% turnout (vs. 49.6% in the county).

United States Senate election results for Blairstown1
Year	Republican		Democratic		Third party(ies)	
Year	No.	%	No.	%	No.	%
2024	2,222	62.96%	1,235	35.00%	72	2.04%
2018	1,598	63.06%	836	32.99%	100	3.95%
2012	1,553	62.24%	895	35.87%	47	1.88%
2006	1,310	63.78%	689	33.54%	55	2.68%

United States Senate election results for Blairstown2
Year	Republican		Democratic		Third party(ies)	
Year	No.	%	No.	%	No.	%
2020	2,220	61.48%	1,297	35.92%	94	2.60%
2014	1,077	66.69%	502	31.08%	36	2.23%
2013	921	68.12%	416	30.77%	15	1.11%
2008	1,912	62.87%	1,071	35.22%	58	1.91%

Former mayors

- 2021 – Rob Moorhead (R)
- 2018–2020 – Stephen Lance (R)
- 2014–2017 – Herman Shoemaker (R)
- 2013 – Richard Mach (R)
- 2012 – Frank Anderson (R)
- 2009–2011 – Richard Mach (R)
- 2006–2008 – Stephen Lance (R)
- 2005 – Alfred Handy (R)
- 2004 – George Joest (R)
- 2003 – William Horsey (R)
- 2002 – George Joest (R)
- 2001 – William Seal (R)
- 2000 – Jane Santini (D)
- 1999 – Joseph DiGrazia (R)
- 1998 – Anita Ardia (I)
- 1996–1997 – Franklin D Shotwell (R)
- 1995 – Charles Eble (R)
- 1990–1994 – Walter Orcutt (R)
- 1989 – Frank Kelly (D)
- 1988 – Howard Mott Sr. (D)

Former committee members

- 2021–2023 – Walter Orcutt (R)
- 2019–2021 – Steven Sikkes (R)
- 2019–2021 – Rob Moorhead (R)
- 2017–2023 – Debra Waldron (R)
- 2016–2018 – Cynthia Dalton (R)
- 2015–2022 – JoAnne VanValkenburg (R)
- 2015 – Harold Price (R)
- 2014–2015 – Susan Price (R)
- 2013–2018 – Paul Avery (R)
- 2012–2017 – Herman Shoemaker (R)
- 2007–2012 – William Seal (R)
- 2006–2011 – Sal Lascari (R)
- 2006–2020 – Stephen Lance (R)
- 2005–2015 – Frank Anderson (R)
- 2005–2013 – Richard Mach (R)
- 2004–2006 – Gary Stevens (R)
- 2003–2005 – Alfred Handy (R)
- 2003–2005 – Raymond Davis (R)
- 2002–2004 – William Horsey (R)
- 2001–2005 – George Joest (R)
- 2001–2003 – JoAnne VanValkenburg (I)
- 1998–2001 – William Seal (R)
- 1997–2002 – Jane Santini (D)
- 1997–2002 – Anita Ardia (I)
- 1995–1997 – Fred Cook (D)
- 1995–1997 – Charles Eble (R)
- 1992–1994 – Robert Rokosz (R)
- 1990–1992 – Anthony Hipple (R)
- 1989–1994 – Walter Orcutt (R)
- 1988–1993 – Robert McElroy (D)
- 1984–1986 – George Wilhelm (R)
- 1981–1987 – Carl Race (R)
- 1979–1987 – Sal Simonetti (R)
- 1978–1983 – Elwyn Barker (R)
- 1975–1979 – Howard Mott Sr. (D)
- 1968–1989 – Frank Kelly (D)

== Education ==
The Blairstown Township School District serves public school students in kindergarten through sixth grade at the Blairstown Elementary School. Students from Hardwick Township, a non-operating school district attend Blairstown Elementary School. As of the 2021–22 school year, the district, comprised of one school, had an enrollment of 435 students and 42.0 classroom teachers (on an FTE basis), for a student–teacher ratio of 10.4:1.

Students in seventh through twelfth grades for public school attend the North Warren Regional High School in Blairstown, a public secondary high school, serving students from the townships of Blairstown, Frelinghuysen, Hardwick and Knowlton. As of the 2021–22 school year, the high school had an enrollment of 658 students and 56.6 classroom teachers (on an FTE basis), for a student–teacher ratio of 11.6:1.

Ridge and Valley Charter School, a K–8 charter school founded in 2004 that is focused on Earth literacy and sustainable living, is located in neighboring Frelinghuysen Township. The school also serves (and grants admission priority to) students from Frelinghuysen, Hardwick and Knowlton Townships, who attend the school without cost to the parents. Students from the township and from all of Warren County are also eligible to attend Warren County Technical School in Washington borough (for 9–12), with special education services provided by local districts supplemented throughout the county by the Warren County Special Services School District in Oxford Township (for PreK–12).

Students from across the world attend Blair Academy, a private boarding school for students in grades 9–12 established in 1848 by philanthropist John Insley Blair.

== Transportation ==
=== Roads and highways ===
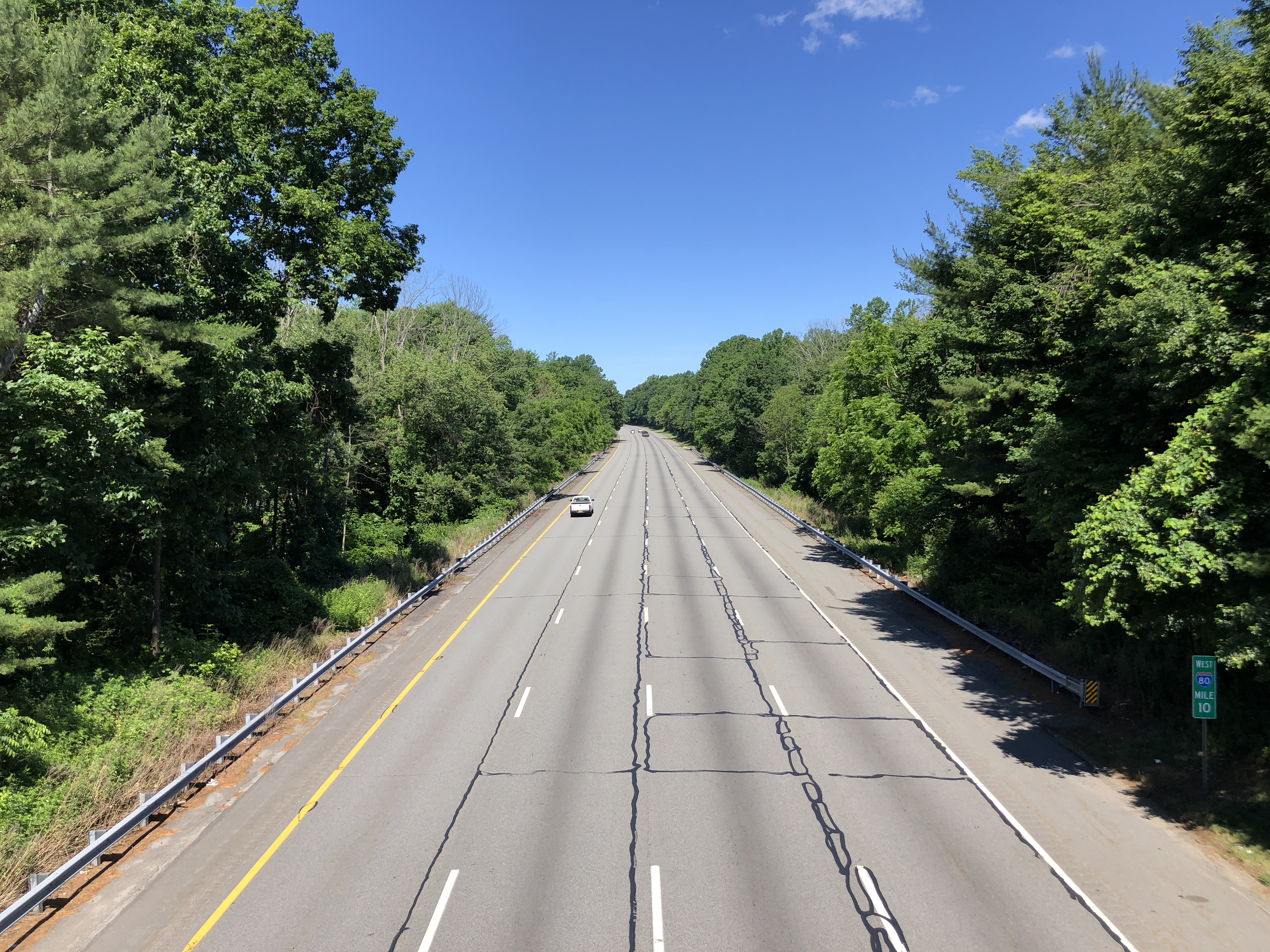
Interstate 80 in Blairstown

As of May 2010, the township had a total of 85.92 miles (138.27 km) of roadways, of which 61.05 miles (98.25 km) were maintained by the municipality, 17.23 miles (27.73 km) by Warren County and 7.64 miles (12.30 km) by the New Jersey Department of Transportation.

Interstate 80 (the Bergen-Passaic Expressway) passes through the southern part of the township for 1.2 miles (1.9 km) without any interchanges, and is accessible via Route 94 and CR 521 in neighboring Knowlton and Hope townships, respectively. Route 94 passes for 6.5 miles (10.5 km) runs east–west through the center of the township while County Route 521 passes through in the eastern section.

=== Airport ===
Blairstown Airport (1N7) is located southwest of the central business district. The airport serves small planes and gliders.

=== Railroads ===
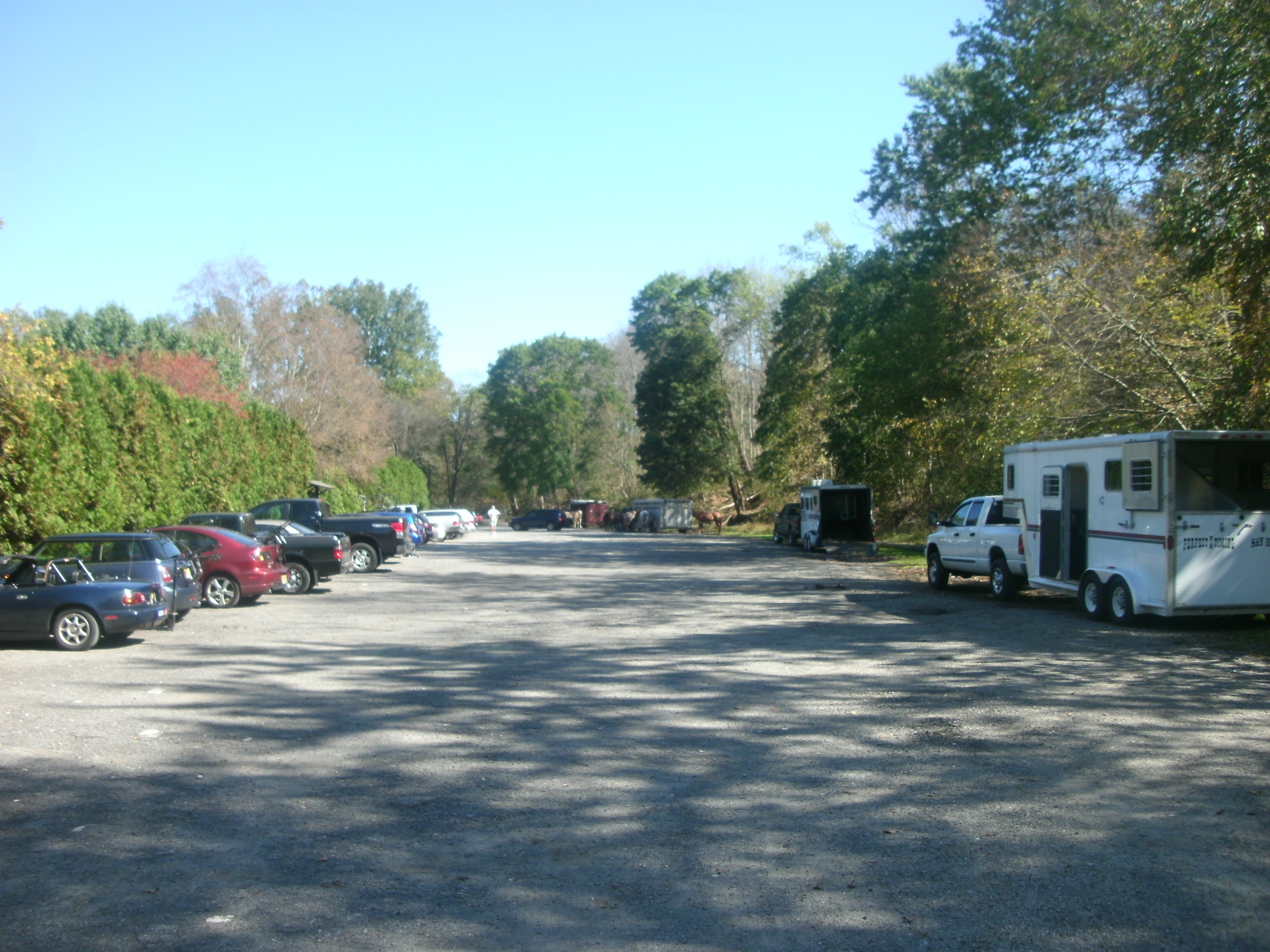
The former New York, Susquehanna and Western Railroad station site in Blairstown in October 2011

The Lackawanna Cut-Off, a high-speed, double-track railway line that stretches for 28.45 miles (45.79 km), was constructed by the Delaware, Lackawanna and Western Railroad between 1908 and 1911, opening for service on December 24, 1911. It ran west from Port Morris, New Jersey to Slateford, Pennsylvania and passed through Blairstown. The DL&W RR merged with the Erie Railroad on October 17, 1960, to form the Erie Lackawanna Railroad. Due to declining revenues, passenger service over the Lackawanna Cut-Off was discontinued on January 6, 1970, and freight service ceased in 1979, just three years after the E-L was absorbed into the Consolidated Railroad Corporation (Conrail). The tracks remained relatively-dormant until 1984, when the property was sold to a developer and the rails were removed.

The right-of-way is now the property of the State of New Jersey, and plans are underway for the restoration of rail service in the future. As part of restoring train service by New Jersey Transit via the Lackawanna Cut-Off, $61 million had been secured to restore railbed and tracks of the former railroad, with passenger service anticipated to be restored in 2026 or 2027. Blairstown's poured concrete passenger and freight stations still stand, although privately owned. The restored service plans include a stop at the Blairstown station as part of extension of Amtrak service to the Poconos and Scranton, Pennsylvania.

Blairstown was also served by a second railroad, the Blairstown Railway. The short line, a personal project of the local industrial magnate John Insley Blair, was constructed in 1876 from Blairstown to Delaware Township, where it connected with the Old Main Line of the Lackawanna RR. The Blairstown Railway was absorbed by the New York, Susquehanna & Western Railroad in 1882 as it built west to the coal fields of Pennsylvania. The NYS&W also operated passenger service between Blairstown and New York (via Jersey City, NJ) until 1935. A third railroad, the Lehigh and New England Railroad, operated through Blairstown via trackage rights over the NYS&W between Swartswood Junction and Hainesburg Junction until October 31, 1961, when the L&NE was abandoned. With the loss of L&NE trackage rights revenues and little local business to sustain the line, the NYS&W also abandoned its line through Blairstown shortly thereafter, and the tracks were removed in 1962. The right-of-way today has been preserved by the State of New Jersey as the 26-mile (42 km) long Paulinskill Valley Trail.

== Landmarks ==
- Blairstown Historic District was added to the National Register of Historic Places in 2007.
- Historic Blairstown Theater (also known as Roy's Hall) was built in 1913 as a silent movie house. The building was restored and painted blue in 2005 and is the centerpiece of Blairstown's vintage Main Street, surrounded by charming shops, galleries and restaurants. The HBT features a regular schedule of live music and theatrical performances, classic film and community events.
- The Blairstown Museum is a private, non-profit corporation organized under New Jersey law managed by a board of directors and housed in a 19th-century building, known as the last remaining structure of "Roy's Row". The Museum is the only general history and cultural museum for the Township of Blairstown. It cares for over 2,000 items that illustrate the history of the township and its inhabitants, including former resident and namesake John Insley Blair.

== Gallery ==
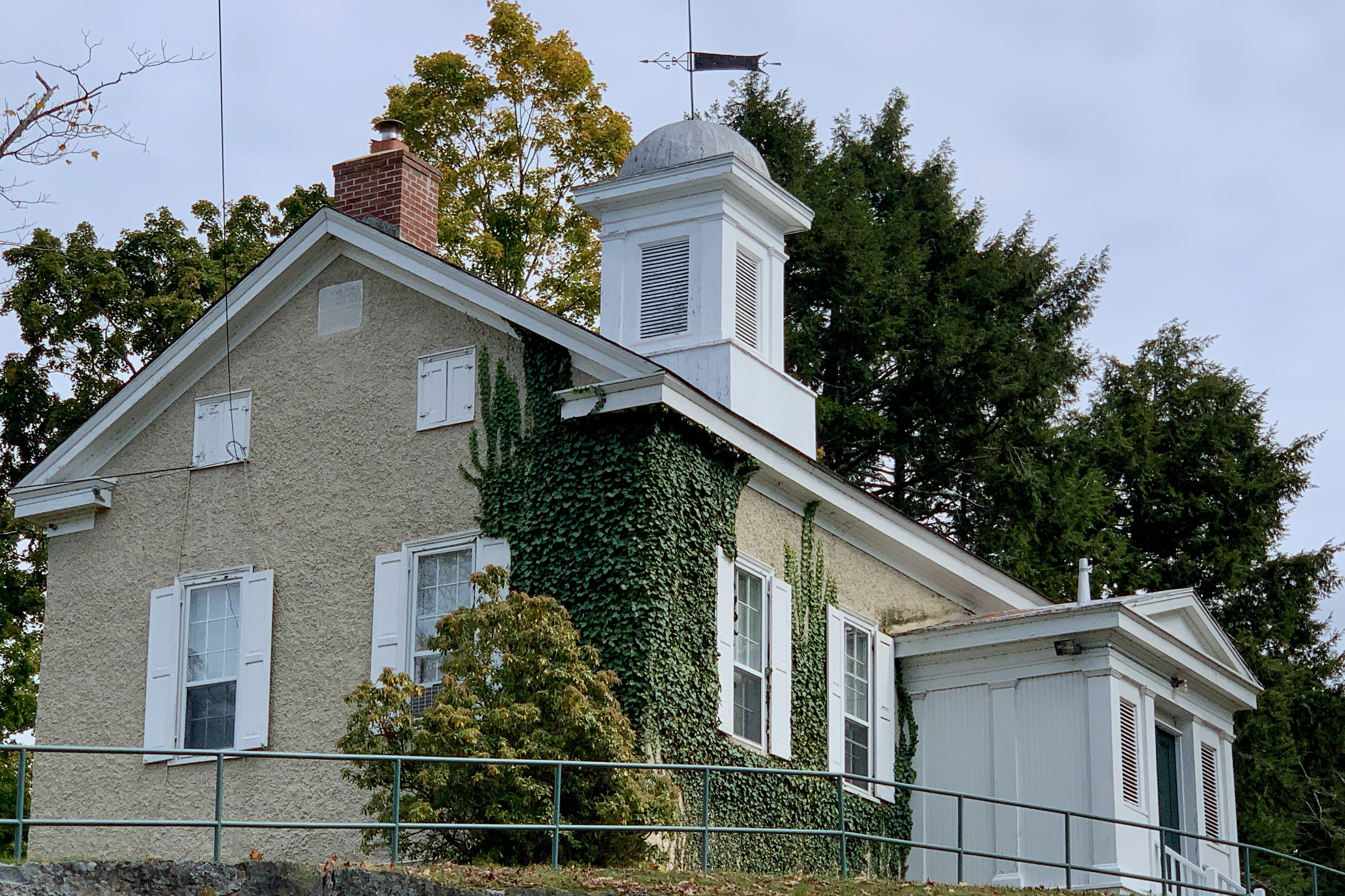
The Old Academy Building of the Blair Academy

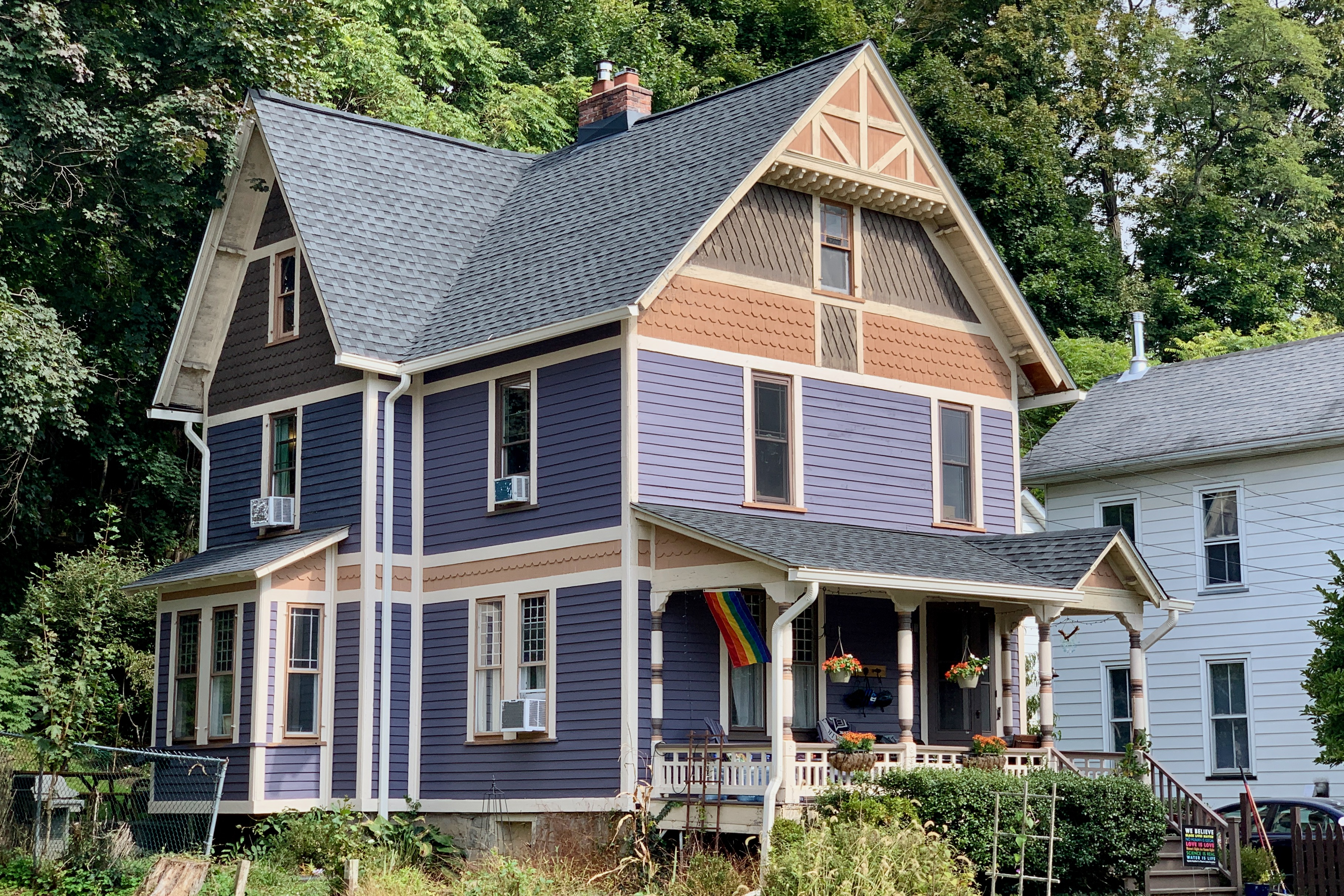
Queen Anne/Stick style house in the Blairstown Historic District

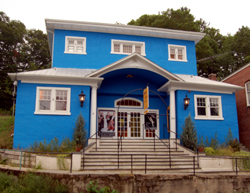
Painted bright blue, historic Roy's Hall is a highlight of Blairstown's Main Street.

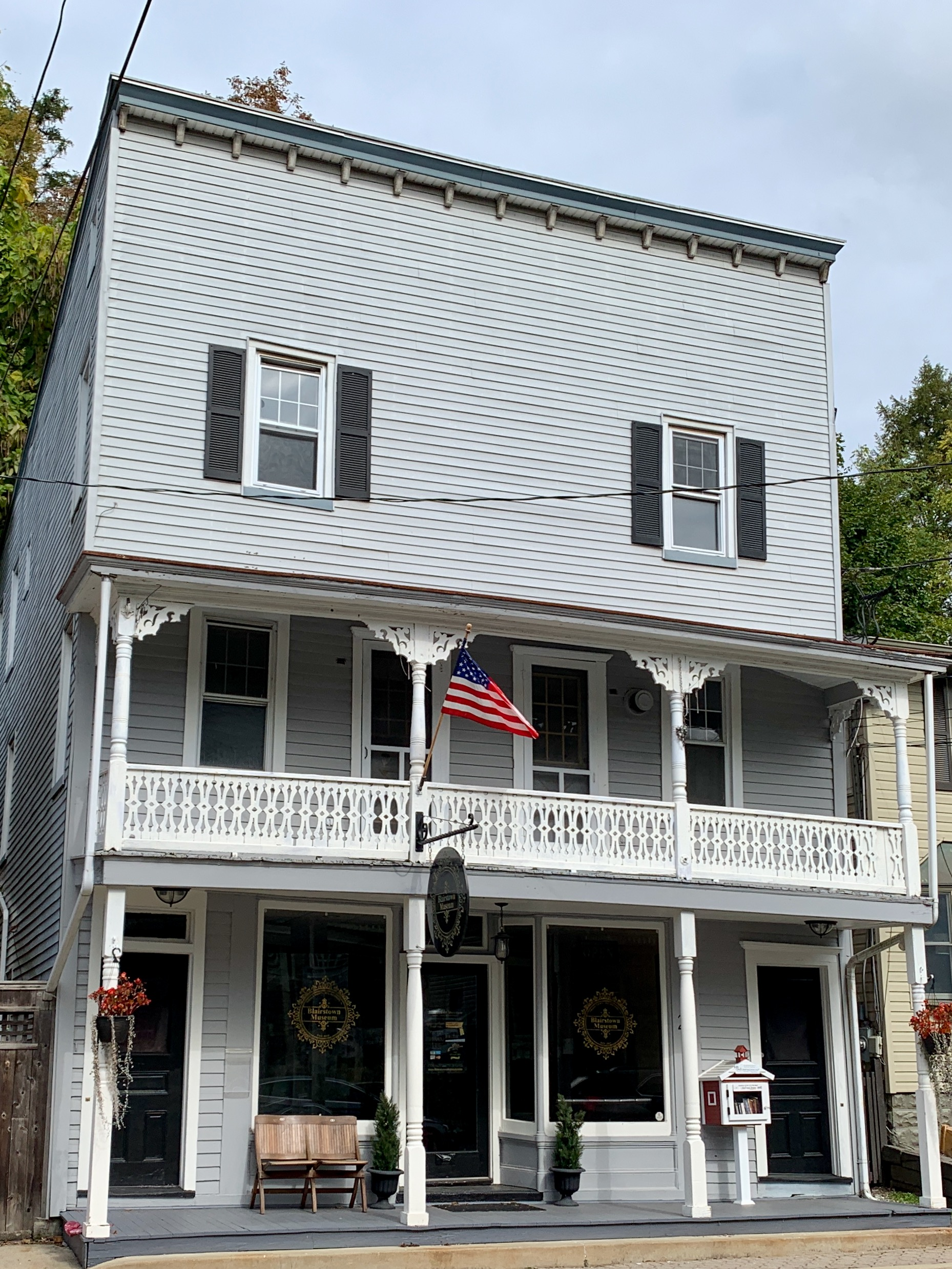
Blairstown Museum

== Popular culture ==
- Scenes from the horror film Friday the 13th were filmed on Blairstown's Main Street, and at the Blairstown Diner on Route 94; the Boy Scout camp No-Be-Bo-Sco in adjacent Hardwick Township was the site for Camp Crystal Lake.
- The body of Dawn Olanick, formerly known as 'Princess Doe' was discovered at the Cedar Ridge Cemetery in Blairstown on July 15, 1982. She became the first unidentified body entered into the FBI's NCIC computer system.
- Scenes from the horror film Plasterhead were filmed at the Blairstown Diner on Route 94 as part of an homage by the filmmakers to Friday the 13th.
- Scenes from the Peacock series Crystal Lake (2026) were filmed at the Blairstown Museum.

== Notable people ==
People who were born in, residents of, or otherwise closely associated with Blairstown include:

- Cathy Bao Bean (born 1942), lives in neighboring Frelinghuysen Township, author of The Chopsticks-Fork Principle: A Memoir and Manual
- Bennett Bean (born 1941), studio potter, lives in neighboring Frelinghuysen Township
- Robert A. Belet (1914–1942), United States Marine Corps master technical sergeant who was awarded the Silver Star for his actions in the Guadalcanal campaign
- DeWitt Clinton Blair (1833–1915), son of John Insley Blair
- John Insley Blair (1802–1899), entrepreneur, railroad magnate, and Blairstown's most famous citizen. Gravel Hill was renamed Blairstown after Blair in 1839
- Anthony D'Amato (born 1987), songwriter and singer
- John A. Haggerty (1841–1910), Wisconsin legislator and businessman who was born in Blairstown
- David T. Little (born 1978), composer
- Nancy Overton (1926–2009), singer best known for her work with The Chordettes
- Lou Reed (1942–2013), musician, singer, songwriter and record producer, lived in neighboring Hardwick Township
- Isaac Wildrick (1803–1892), represented New Jersey's 3rd congressional district in the United States House of Representatives from 1849 to 1853
