= Blairstown (CDP), New Jersey =

Populated place in Warren County, New Jersey, US

Blairstown, New Jersey
- Census-designated place
- Location in Warren County Location in New Jersey Location in the United States
- Coordinates: 40.987381°N 74.954581°W
- Country: United States
- State: New Jersey
- County: Warren
- Township: Blairstown

Area
  - Total: 0.43 sq mi (1.11 km^{2})
  - Land: 0.42 sq mi (1.09 km^{2})
  - Water: 0.012 sq mi (0.03 km^{2}) 1.65%
- Elevation: 440 ft (134 m)

Population (2020)
  - Total: 493
  - Density: 1,175.7/sq mi (453.93/km^{2})
- Time zone: UTC−05:00 (Eastern (EST))
  - Summer (DST): UTC−04:00 (EDT)
- ZIP Code: 07825
- Area code: 908
- FIPS code: 34-06130
- GNIS feature ID: 02583969

Blairstown is an unincorporated community and census-designated place (CDP) located within Blairstown Township, in Warren County, in the U.S. state of New Jersey. The CDP was created as part of the 2010 United States census. As of the 2010 United States census, the CDP's population was 515.

== Geography ==
According to the United States Census Bureau, the CDP had a total area of 0.432 square miles (1.120 km^{2}), including 0.425 square miles (1.102 km^{2}) of land and 0.007 square miles (0.019 km^{2}) of water (1.65%).

== Demographics ==
Historical population
Census	Pop.	Note	%±
2010	515		—
2020	493		−4.3%
U.S. Decennial Census; 2010 2020

Blairstown first appeared as a census designated place in the 2010 U.S. census.

=== 2010 census ===
Blairstown CDP, New Jersey – Racial and ethnic composition Note: the US Census treats Hispanic/Latino as an ethnic category. This table excludes Latinos from the racial categories and assigns them to a separate category. Hispanics/Latinos may be of any race.
Race / Ethnicity (NH = Non-Hispanic)	Pop 2010	Pop 2020	% 2010	% 2020
White alone (NH)	486	406	94.37%	82.35%
Black or African American alone (NH)	4	11	0.78%	2.23%
Native American or Alaska Native alone (NH)	0	2	0.00%	0.41%
Asian alone (NH)	3	9	0.58%	1.83%
Native Hawaiian or Pacific Islander alone (NH)	0	0	0.00%	0.00%
Other race alone (NH)	1	6	0.19%	1.22%
Mixed race or Multiracial (NH)	3	25	0.58%	5.07%
Hispanic or Latino (any race)	18	34	3.50%	6.90%
Total	515	493	100.00%	100.00%

=== 2010 census ===
The 2010 United States census counted 515 people, 201 households, and 134 families in the CDP. The population density was 1,210.7 per square mile (467.5/km^{2}). There were 219 housing units at an average density of 514.8 per square mile (198.8/km^{2}). The racial makeup was 96.89% (499) White, 0.78% (4) Black or African American, 0.00% (0) Native American, 0.58% (3) Asian, 0.00% (0) Pacific Islander, 0.97% (5) from other races, and 0.78% (4) from two or more races. Hispanic or Latino of any race were 3.50% (18) of the population.

Of the 201 households, 30.3% had children under the age of 18; 41.8% were married couples living together; 17.4% had a female householder with no husband present and 33.3% were non-families. Of all households, 26.4% were made up of individuals and 5.5% had someone living alone who was 65 years of age or older. The average household size was 2.42 and the average family size was 2.93.

22.7% of the population were under the age of 18, 10.7% from 18 to 24, 25.8% from 25 to 44, 32.6% from 45 to 64, and 8.2% who were 65 years of age or older. The median age was 37.6 years. For every 100 females, the population had 114.6 males. For every 100 females ages 18 and older there were 109.5 males.
