= Murder of Dawn Olanick =

Formerly unidentified homicide victim found in 1982

Dawn Olanick
- Undated photograph of Olanick
- Born: August 5, 1964; Manhattan, New York, U.S.
- Disappeared: 1982; Bohemia, New York, U.S.
- Status: Publicly identified on July 15, 2022
- Died: c. July 1982 (aged 17)
- Cause of death: Homicide by beating
- Body discovered: July 15, 1982
- Resting place: Cedar Ridge Cemetery, Blairstown, New Jersey, U.S.
- Other name: Princess Doe
- Height: 5 ft 2 in (1.57 m) - 5 ft 4 in (1.63 m) (approximate)
- Website: princessdoe.org

Dawn Rita Olanick (August 5, 1964 – c. July 1982), previously known as Princess Doe, was an unidentified American teenage decedent from Bohemia, New York, who was found murdered in Cedar Ridge Cemetery in Blairstown Township, New Jersey on July 15, 1982. Her face had been bludgeoned beyond recognition. She was the first unidentified decedent to be entered in the National Crime Information Center. Olanick was publicly identified on the 40th anniversary of her discovery.

Arthur Kinlaw has been charged with first degree murder in Olanick's case. Olanick's body was buried in the Cedar Ridge Cemetery, not far from where she was discovered in January 1983. Her remains were exhumed in 1999 so that samples could be collected from her femur for DNA testing in Baltimore, Maryland. Olanick was reburied in the same grave. Prior to her 2022 identification, Olanick was known as "Princess Doe," a nickname given to her by Lt. Eric Kranz of the Blairstown Police Department, who was the first law enforcement official to respond to the scene of her discovery.

== Discovery and examination ==
Two of many previous reconstructions of Dawn Olanick, one depicting her as a brunette, the other depicting her as a blonde.

On the morning of July 15, 1982, gravedigger George Kise discovered the body of Olanick in the rear of Cedar Ridge Cemetery in Blairstown, New Jersey. The body was found lying on its back just over a steep bank that leads to a creek below. The victim's face had been beaten beyond recognition with a yet-to-be-determined object. Due to the significant decomposition of her body, her eye color could not be discerned.

The body was clad in a red short-sleeved shirt. A peasant-style skirt was found lying on top of the victim's legs. No undergarments were found. Despite this, no conclusive evidence of sexual assault was found, but this was difficult to determine because of the degree of decay of the body. A golden cross necklace was found tangled in the victim's hair. Two earrings were found in her left ear. Red nail polish was found on the right hand only and she had no known surgical scars, distinct birth marks or tattoos. Scars or marks on the head/face area would not be known due to the condition of the body. The front two teeth were slightly darker than the other teeth. The victim's appendix and tonsils were intact. Forensic anthropologists determined that the victim was not pregnant and had never given birth, and was most likely between the ages of 14 and 18 years old at the time of her death. Toxicology did not reveal any traces of drugs, but was not entirely conclusive because of the time elapsed between the death and discovery of the body. It is believed that the body was discovered after two to three days, or possibly even weeks, of exposure to the elements. This was especially difficult to determine because of the hot and humid weather in the area at the time.

Examination indicated that the girl had attempted to fight back or defend from her attacker, as trauma to her hands and arms was observed.

== Investigation ==
=== Diane Genice Dye ===
For many years, Princess Doe was thought to be Diane Genice Dye, a missing teenager from San Jose, California, who vanished on July 30, 1979. This theory was propagated by several law enforcement officials in the state of New Jersey, who went as far as to hold a press conference identifying Diane Dye as Princess Doe. However, Lt. Eric Kranz, the Princess Doe case's original lead investigator, maintained that Diane Dye was not a viable candidate for Princess Doe's identity. Kranz's feelings were shared by Diane's family and investigators in California, who were particularly incensed by the conduct of New Jersey law enforcement. In 2003, Princess Doe's DNA was compared with a DNA sample from Diane's mother Patricia, and it was conclusively determined that the Princess Doe was not Diane Dye.

=== Arthur and Donna Kinlaw ===
Police sketch of Olanick after interviewing Donna Kinlaw

In 1999, evidence came to light that Arthur and Donna Kinlaw may have been involved in Princess Doe's murder. Donna was arrested in California for attempting to commit welfare fraud by using the name "Elaina," which was traced to a Long Island native. When the police questioned her, she gave them details about the murder of "Linda," and her testimony put the Kinlaws behind bars; Donna gave details about two murders Arthur had committed of two other female victims who remain unidentified. After Arthur was faced with a death sentence, Donna told authorities that Kinlaw had killed another woman, a sex worker, earlier in 1982.

She told police that she was with Arthur in the cemetery and witnessed him commit the murder. Another report states that Donna Kinlaw said that in July 1982, her husband brought home a teenage girl, left home, and returned without her. He later apparently disposed of his clothing and cleaned his vehicle. Afterward, he threatened his wife, claiming if she did not attend her job, he would "take her life" as he did to the girl he brought home. However, a lack of corroboration meant that Arthur Kinlaw was not charged. Lt. Stephen Speirs, who worked on the case as a member of the Warren County Prosecutor's Office, from which he is now retired, stated that Kinlaw "claimed responsibility for her death, but I have no physical evidence to confirm that. Without the identity of Princess Doe, I have no way of connecting the dots, so to speak, putting her in a place where he could have been or would have been at the same time." Speirs also reported that he doubted the confession because the Kinlaws could not provide a name for Princess Doe even though they had claimed to have been with her for a period of time. Despite the fact that he questions the credibility of their statements, Speirs does believe the victim was native to Long Island, New York. However, Donna Kinlaw was interviewed by a forensic artist who created a sketch of the girl she claimed to have met, which does resemble the most recent composite. Arthur Kinlaw remains incarcerated for two counts of second-degree murder. Apart from the Kinlaws, several other suspects have been reconsidered to be involved in the case. Following the 2022 identification of Princess Doe as Dawn Olanick, Arthur Kinlaw was reconsidered as a suspect and later charged with Olanick's murder.

=== Later developments ===
After seeing images of the girl's clothing in a newspaper, a witness named Annemarie Latimer reported to officials that she remembered seeing a girl wearing the same clothing as Princess Doe purchasing cigarettes on July 13, 1982, just two days before her body was found. Latimer stated that she was shopping with her daughter at a supermarket across from the cemetery and observed, and was able to describe, the victim's unique clothing. The shirt and skirt themselves were traced to a manufacturer in the Midwestern United States, although the brand labels were missing. Three people reported, after viewing photos, that they bought similar clothes at a Long Island store, which is now closed. It is unknown if the store was specifically located in Long Island or possibly in other locations. The 2012 composite of the victim also generated new tips, as it resembled several missing girls from the country. Her body was re-exhumed in November 2020 using a grant, and she underwent DNA extraction for genetic genealogy.

One theory was submitted that Princess Doe may have been a runaway and could have been an individual using false names while employed at a hotel in Ocean City, Maryland. In 2012, a sample of her hair and a tooth were examined through isotope analysis and indicated that the victim was most likely born in the United States. The sample of her hair indicated that she had lived at least seven to ten months in the Midwestern or Northeastern United States. The tooth sample indicated she could possibly be from Arizona. It is also believed that the girl had spent a long period of time in Long Island, New York.

== Media appearances ==
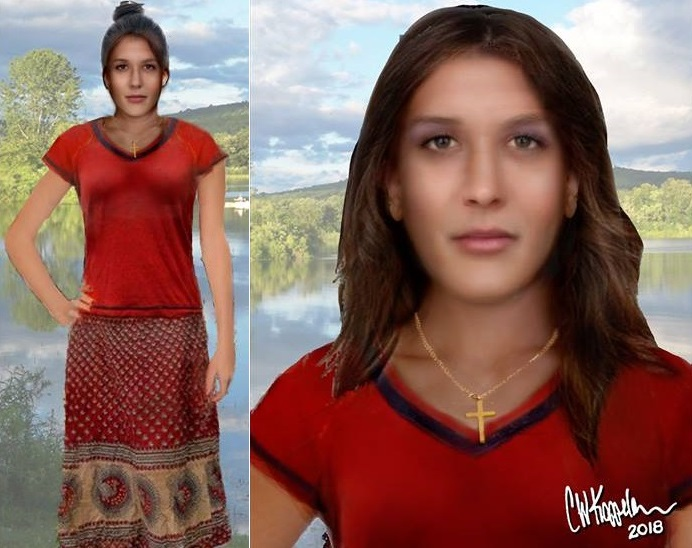
Additional composite of Olanick by Carl Koppelman that also illustrates her clothing

=== MISSING (HBO Documentary) ===
After extensive print media coverage in 1982, Lt. Eric Kranz, the original lead investigator from the Blairstown Police Department, was contacted by HBO regarding the Princess Doe case and asked if the channel could chronicle the case in an upcoming documentary entitled MISSING. Kranz agreed and the segment was filmed over the course of several weeks. Kranz was shown following leads as they came in. The documentary was notable for containing actual footage of the recovery of Princess Doe's body along with footage shot by HBO of Princess Doe's 1983 funeral. The documentary also contained a segment following the Johnny Gosch disappearance.

Lt. Kranz, now retired, coined the name "Princess Doe" early in the investigation and also managed to get the case covered extensively in the media. The case was used as the impetus for recording unidentified crime victims in the NCIC database at the national level. Princess Doe became the first such case entered by the FBI director.

=== Miscellaneous ===
The case was featured on America's Most Wanted in 2012 in hopes to generate new information in the case.

The same year, the most recent reconstruction was broadcast on CNN.

== Burial and memorials ==
Olanick was buried on January 22, 1983, after she had remained unidentified for over five months. Donated funds were used to pay for the victim's coffin and headstone. The headstone was engraved with the text "Princess Doe. Missing from home. Dead among strangers. Remembered by all."

On July 15, 2012, a memorial service was held for the 30th anniversary of Olanick's body being discovered, at the top of the ravine where her remains were found. Over 100 citizens attended as well as several reporters and cameras. The victim's clothing as well as her reconstructions were displayed for public viewing.

On October 12, 2014, Olanick (as "Princess Doe") was honored at a missing persons rally in the area.

== Identification ==
In May 2021, investigators were notified by the NCMEC or National Center for Missing and Exploited Children, who were collaborating with Astrea Forensics, about obtaining DNA markers from degraded samples of Princess Doe's body using a grant. On June 18, 2021, investigators received the news that Astrea Forensics agreed to extract DNA and construct a DNA profile. On February 10, 2022, Astrea Forensics relayed to investigators that the creation of a DNA data file was successful. The results were sent to the NCMEC's consulting genealogists from Innovative Forensics Investigations. The managing officer was Jennifer Moore, who agreed to perform unlimited genealogy free of charge. On February 22, 2022, Innovative Forensics announced to investigators that they had found a candidate for Princess Doe. Investigators went to West Babylon, New York where they met Robert Olanick Jr, Dawn Olanick's brother. They also collected a DNA sample from Olanick's sister, which Mitotyping Technology used to build a mitochondrial DNA profile. The Union County Prosecutor's Office Forensic Laboratory assisted by creating a STR DNA profile through the sister's DNA sample. Mitotyping Technology sent their results to the Union County Prosecutor's Office Forensic Laboratory who then sent both the mitochondrial DNA and STR DNA profiles to the University of North Texas Center for Human Identification.

On April 29, 2022, the Center identified Princess Doe as Dawn Rita Olanick. This was formally announced on July 15, 2022, the 40th anniversary of her discovery. Prior to her disappearance, Olanick lived with her mother and sister in the city of Bohemia on Long Island after her parents divorced. Robert Olanick Jr. said that she left home around June 24, 1982, at their mother's request and was never seen or heard from again. Arthur Kinlaw has been charged with one count of homicide as a result of the subsequent investigation, witness statements, and his confession to Olanick's murder. It is believed that Olanick refused his demands to go into sex work, and was driven to New Jersey. They both ended up in Blairstown, where Kinlaw murdered her in the Cedar Ridge Cemetery. Neither Olanick or Kinlaw had a connection with the town. Kinlaw remains imprisoned at the Sullivan Correctional Facility in Fallsburg, New York. Investigators are now looking to piece together Dawn Olanick's movements in the time leading up to her death.

== Other information ==
- NCIC Case Number: U630870962
- Porchlight for the Missing Case Number: NJF820715
- Princess Doe website (http://www.princessdoe.org)

== See also ==
- List of murdered American children
- Lists of solved missing person cases
- List of unsolved murders (1980–1999)
- Murder of Carolyn Eaton, another young woman found dead in 1982; identified in 2021
