= Blairstown Historic District =

Historic district in New Jersey, United States

- U.S. National Register of Historic Places
- U.S. Historic district
- New Jersey Register of Historic Places
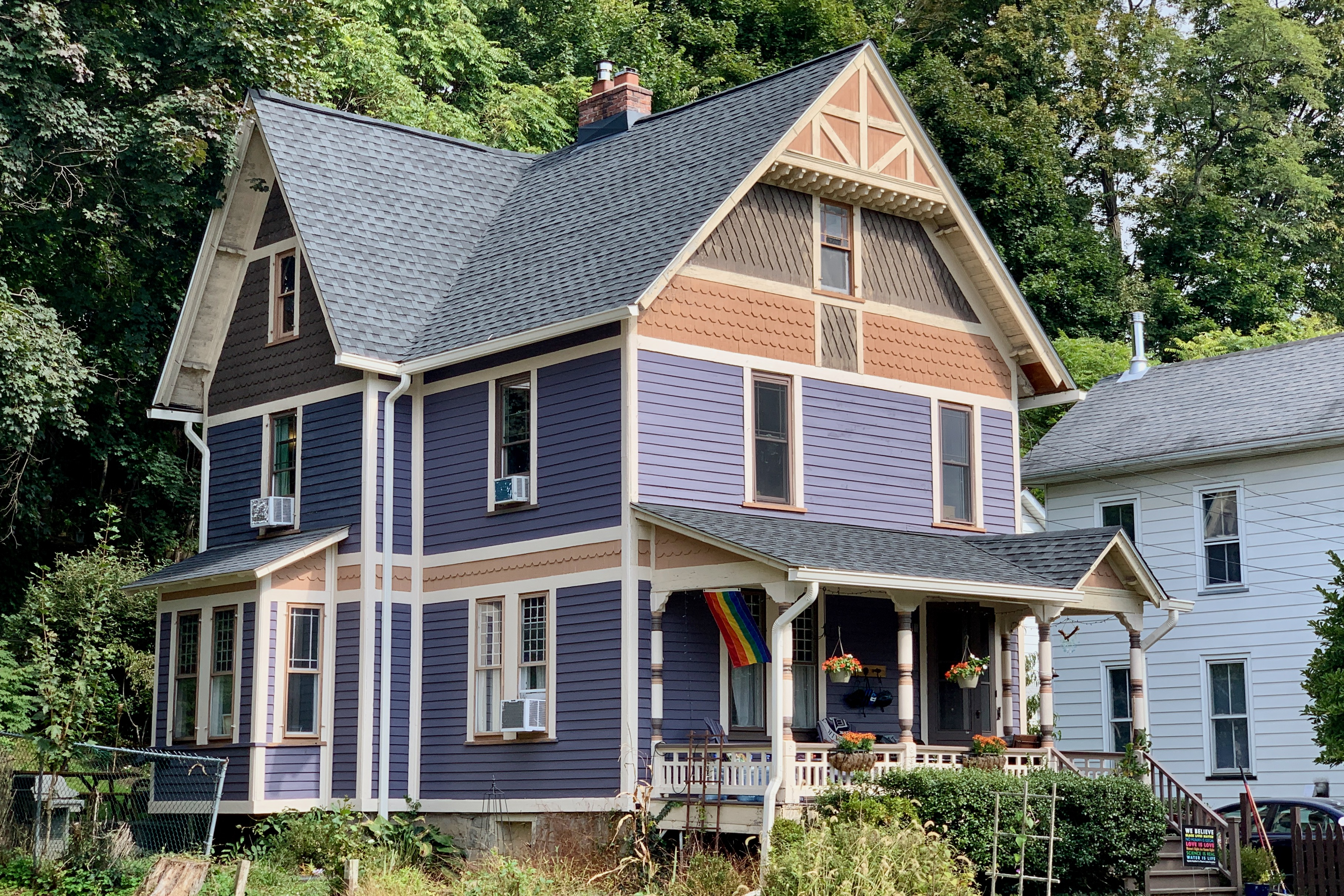
- Queen Anne/Stick style house

- Location within Warren County, New Jersey Location within New Jersey Location within the United States
- Location: Main Street, East Avenue, Douglas Street, Water Street, Blair Place, Blairstown, New Jersey
- Coordinates: 40°58′59″N 74°57′35″W
- Area: 55 acres (22 ha)
- Architect: Charles Graham; Addison Hutton
- Architectural style: Italianate, Queen Anne, et al.
- NRHP reference No.: 07000046
- NJRHP No.: 3493

Significant dates
- Added to NRHP: February 16, 2007
- Designated NJRHP: December 15, 2006

Blairstown Historic District is located in Blairstown, Warren County, New Jersey. The district was added to the National Register of Historic Places on February 16, 2007, for its significance in architecture, commerce, and community development. It includes a grist mill originally built in 1825 that once served as town's library and is now part of Blair Academy.

== Gallery of contributing properties ==
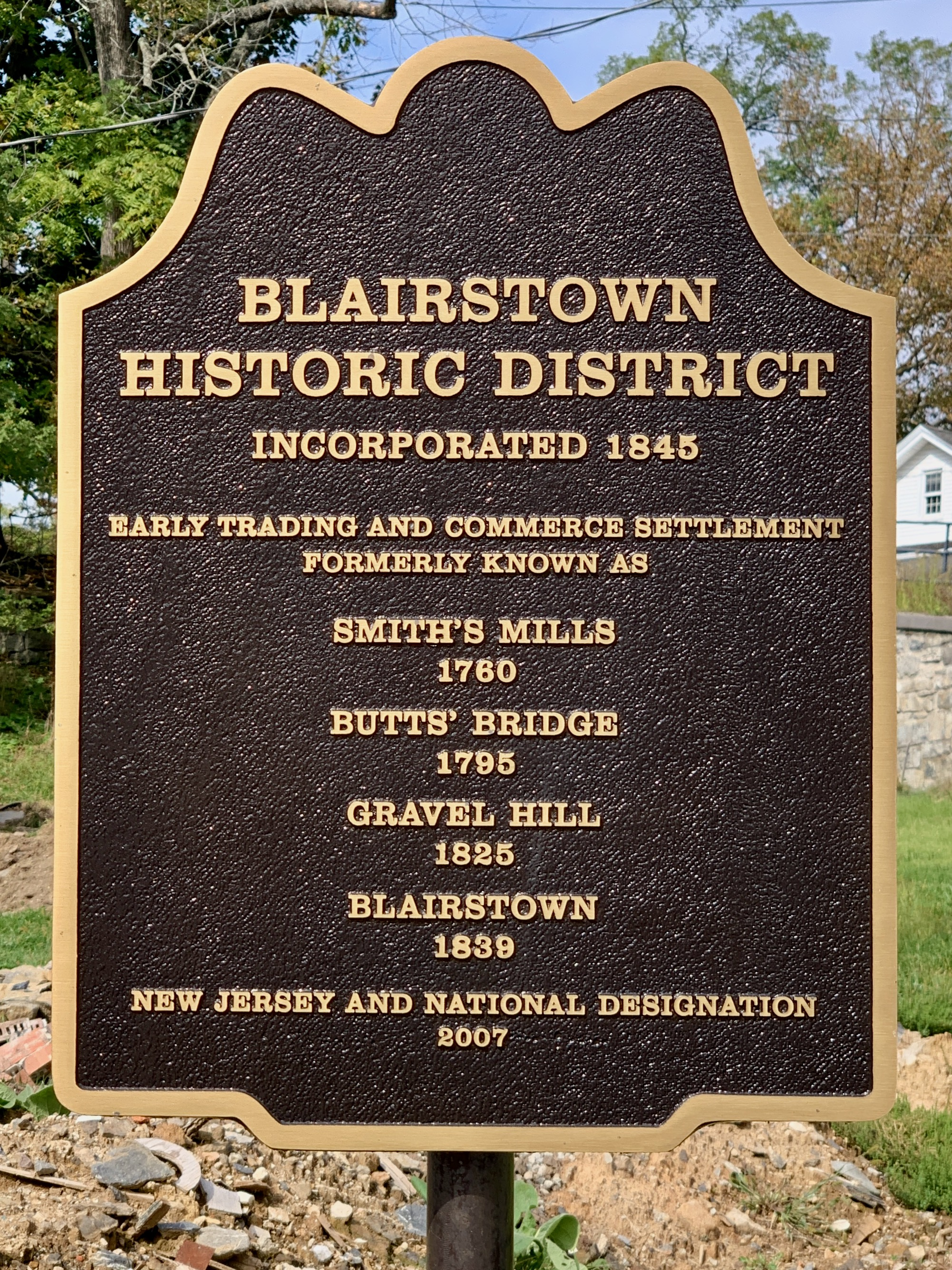
District information sign

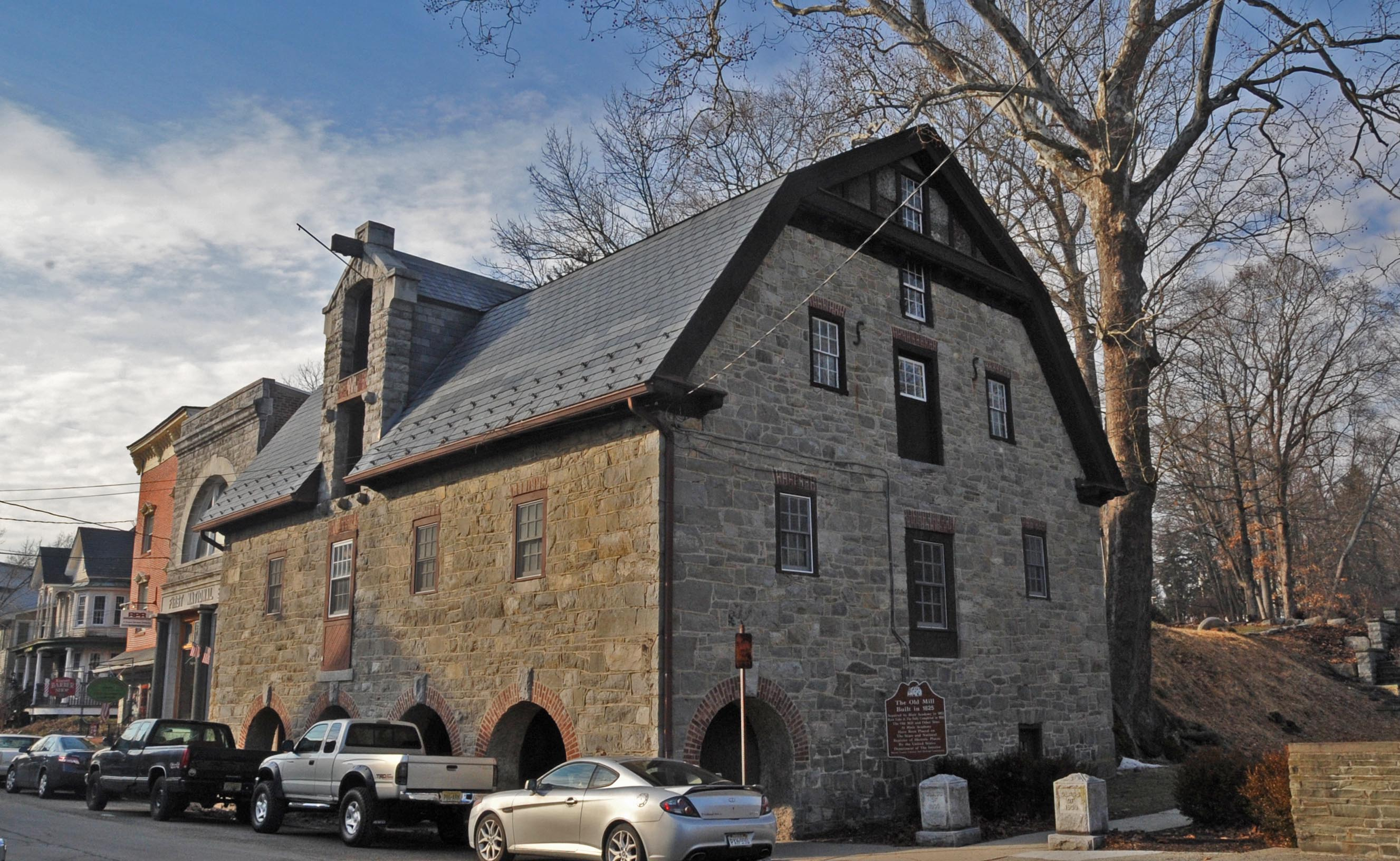
The Mill

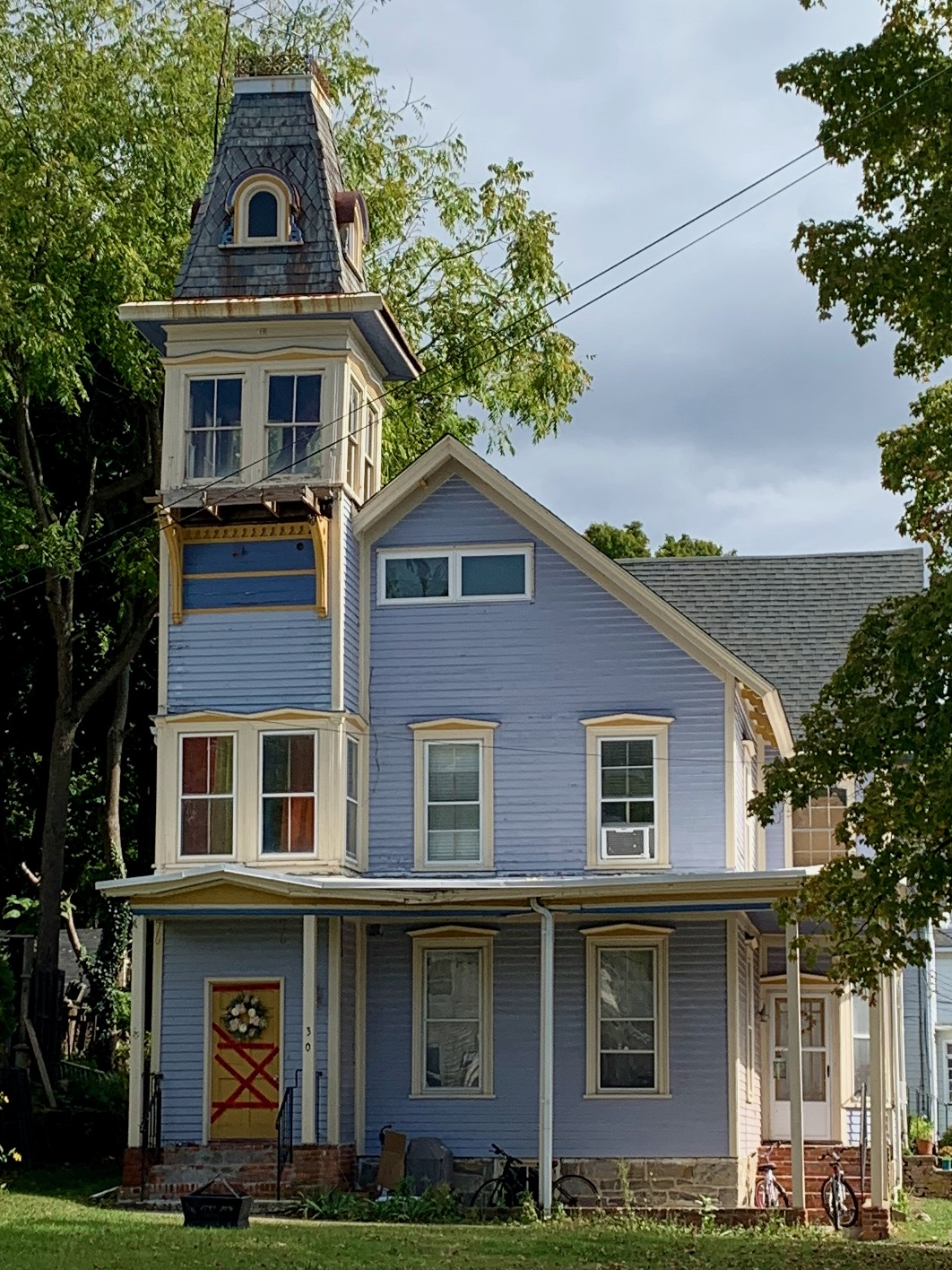
Italianate and Second Empire style

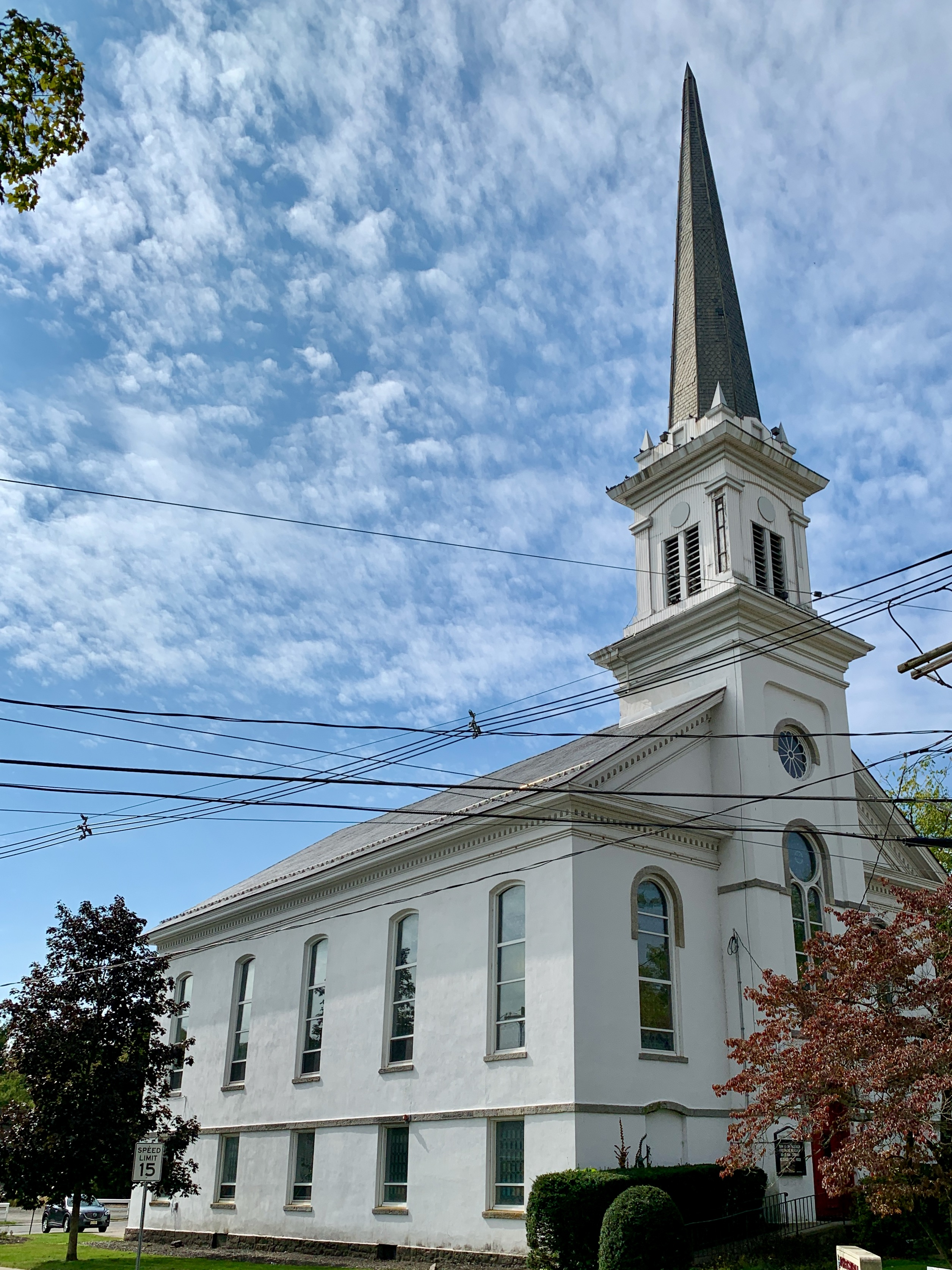
First Presbyterian Church

== See also ==
- National Register of Historic Places listings in Warren County, New Jersey
