= Michael Kinlaw =

American entrepreneur and politician

Michael Wayne Kinlaw (born 1973) is an American mortgage broker and politician from Texas who was a Republican candidate for the 2016 United States presidential election. He is currently living in Colorado Springs, Colorado. He was also the founder of the Houston-based company Manhattan Mortgage, running it from 2002 to its closure in 2008.
