= Blairstown Airport =

Airport in Blairstown, New Jersey, United States

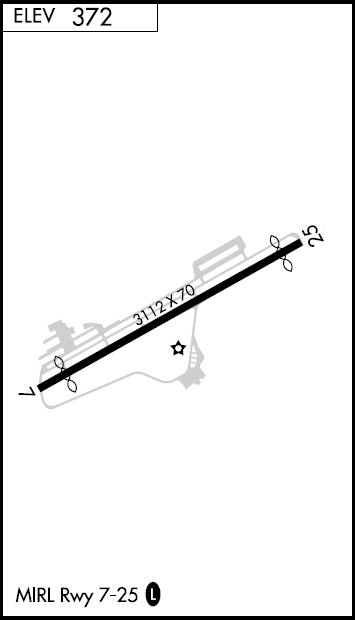
- IATA: none; ICAO: none; FAA LID: 1N7

Summary
- Airport type: Public-use
- Owner: J.D. Air Inc.
- Operator: Dennis Kiernan
- Serves: Blairstown, New Jersey
- Location: Warren County, New Jersey
- Elevation AMSL: 372 ft (113 m)
- Coordinates: 40°58′16″N 074°59′51″W
- Website: Blairstown Airport

Map
- Interactive map of Blairstown Airport

Runways
Direction	Length		Surface
Direction	ft	m	Surface
7/25	3,112	949	Asphalt

Statistics (2014)
- Aircraft operations: 19,790
- Based aircraft: 143
- Source: Federal Aviation Administration

Blairstown Airport (FAA LID: 1N7) is a public-use airport located two nautical miles (3.7 km) southwest of the central business district of Blairstown, Warren County, New Jersey, United States. It is privately owned by J.D. Air Inc. Blairstown is located in the Lehigh Valley, 5 miles (8.0 km) from the Delaware Water Gap and 65 miles (105 km) from New York City. The southeastern edge of the airport property sits upon the path of the former Lackawanna Cut-Off railway line.

== Facilities and aircraft ==
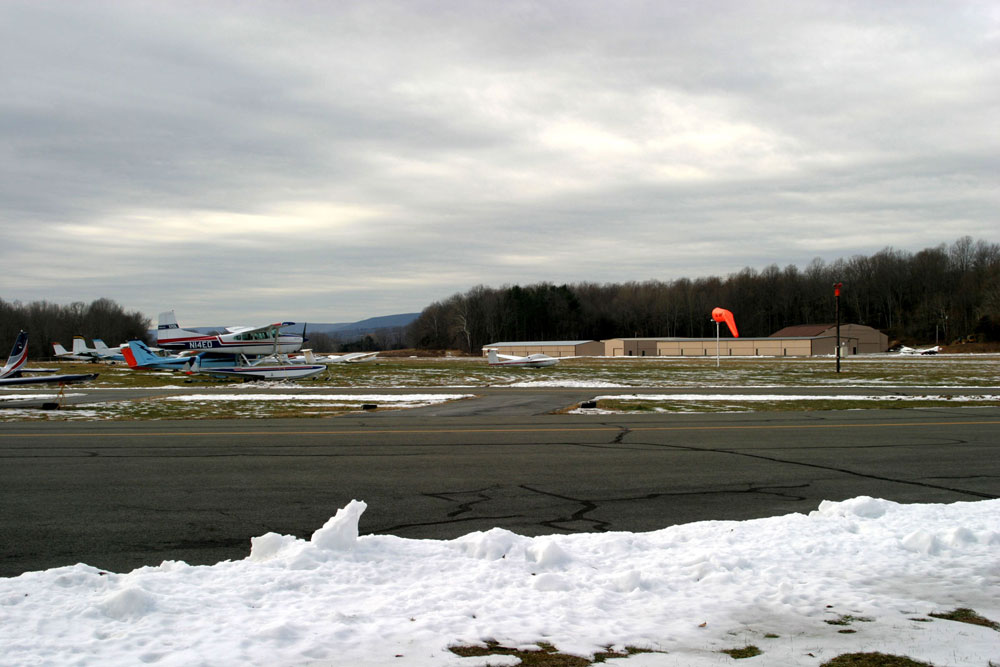
Looking over several parked airplanes

Blairstown Airport covers an area of 151 acres (61 ha) at an elevation of 372 ft (113 m) and contains one runway designated 7/25 with an asphalt surface measuring 3,112 x 70 ft (949 x 21 m).

For the 12-month period ending January 1, 2014, the airport had 19,790 general aviation aircraft operations, an average of 54 per day. At that time there were 143 aircraft based at this airport: 56% single-engine, 5% multi-engine, 3% helicopter and 36% glider.

Services available on field include 100LL fuel, major airframe service, major powerplant service, tie-downs, hangars, parking, flight school and glider operation. There is a small restaurant located on the field called The Airport Café. There are several shops and a supermarket located about 1 mile (1.6 km) north of the airport.
