= Hainesburg, New Jersey =

Populated place in Warren County, New Jersey, US

- Census-designated place
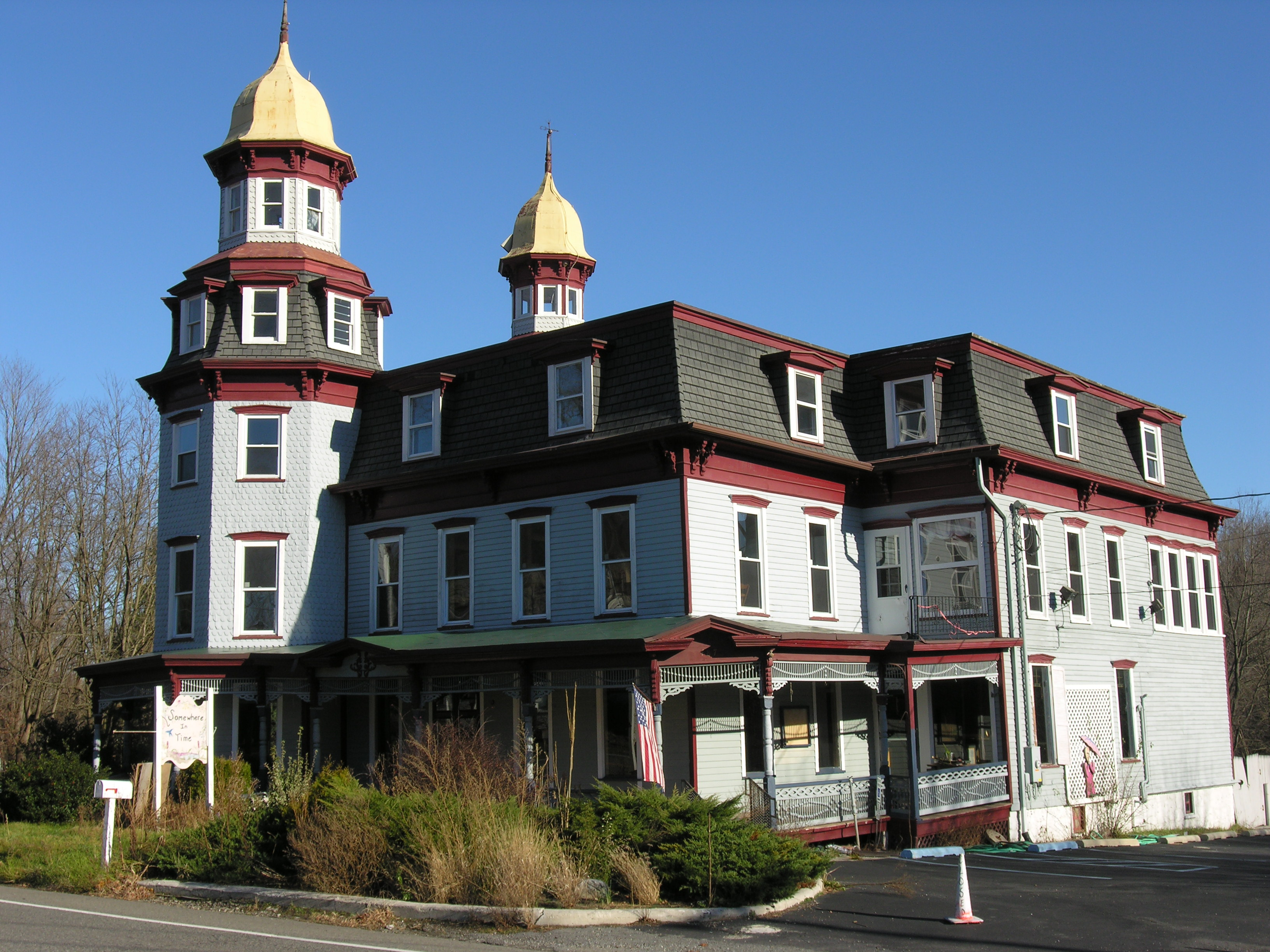
- The former Hainesburg Inn

- Location in Warren County Location in New Jersey Location in the United States
- Coordinates: 40.9561°N 75.0621°W
- Country: United States
- State: New Jersey
- County: Warren
- Township: Knowlton
- Named after: John Haines

Area
  - Total: 1.53 sq mi (3.95 km^{2})
  - Land: 1.50 sq mi (3.89 km^{2})
  - Water: 0.019 sq mi (0.05 km^{2}) 0.84%
- Elevation: 318 ft (97 m)

Population (2020)
  - Total: 422
  - Density: 280.7/sq mi (108.37/km^{2})
- Time zone: UTC−05:00 (Eastern (EST))
  - Summer (DST): UTC−04:00 (EDT)
- Area code: 908
- FIPS code: 34-28920
- GNIS feature ID: 02583997

Hainesburg is an unincorporated community and census-designated place (CDP) located within Knowlton Township in Warren County, in the U.S. state of New Jersey. While the community has existed for over a century, the CDP was designated as part of the 2010 United States census. As of the 2020 census, Hainesburg had a population of 422.

== History ==
Hainesburg is located next to Paulins Kill, and a stone grist mill was erected on that waterway prior to the American Revolution. The mill was destroyed by fire in 1908.

A tannery was built in 1840 by Jacob Hibler.

Land was acquired at Hainesburg in 1843 by the Beck brothers, who divided it into lots. Originally known as "Sodom", the town's first post office was called "Hainesburg" in honor of John Haines, who made a significant donation to a school located there.

A saw mill was built by George Adams in 1881, and a station on the New York, Susquehanna and Western Railway was located in Hainesburg.

== Geography ==
According to the United States Census Bureau, the CDP had a total area of 0.156 square miles (0.405 km^{2}), including 0.155 square miles (0.402 km^{2}) of land and 0.001 square miles (0.003 km^{2}) of water (0.84%).

== Demographics ==
Historical population
| Census | Pop. | Note | %± |
|---|---|---|---|
| 2010 | 91 | | — |
| 2020 | 422 | | 363.7% |
U.S. Decennial Census; 2010 2020

Hainesburg first appeared as a census designated place in the 2010 U.S. census.

=== 2020 census ===
Hainesburg CDP, New Jersey – Racial and ethnic composition Note: the US Census treats Hispanic/Latino as an ethnic category. This table excludes Latinos from the racial categories and assigns them to a separate category. Hispanics/Latinos may be of any race.
| Race / Ethnicity (NH = Non-Hispanic) | Pop 2010 | Pop 2020 | % 2010 | % 2020 |
|---|---|---|---|---|
| White alone (NH) | 79 | 342 | 86.81% | 81.04% |
| Black or African American alone (NH) | 0 | 4 | 0.00% | 0.95% |
| Native American or Alaska Native alone (NH) | 2 | 1 | 2.20% | 0.24% |
| Asian alone (NH) | 0 | 3 | 0.00% | 0.71% |
| Native Hawaiian or Pacific Islander alone (NH) | 0 | 2 | 0.00% | 0.47% |
| Other race alone (NH) | 0 | 2 | 0.00% | 0.47% |
| Mixed race or Multiracial (NH) | 0 | 40 | 0.00% | 9.48% |
| Hispanic or Latino (any race) | 10 | 28 | 10.99% | 6.64% |
| Total | 91 | 422 | 100.00% | 100.00% |

=== 2010 census ===
The 2010 United States census counted 91 people, 29 households, and 23 families in the CDP. The population density was 586.3 per square mile (226.4/km^{2}). There were 36 housing units at an average density of 231.9 per square mile (89.5/km^{2}). The racial makeup was 96.70% (88) White, 0.00% (0) Black or African American, 2.20% (2) Native American, 0.00% (0) Asian, 0.00% (0) Pacific Islander, 1.10% (1) from other races, and 0.00% (0) from two or more races. Hispanic or Latino of any race were 10.99% (10) of the population.

Of the 29 households, 41.4% had children under the age of 18; 62.1% were married couples living together; 6.9% had a female householder with no husband present and 20.7% were non-families. Of all households, 17.2% were made up of individuals and 3.4% had someone living alone who was 65 years of age or older. The average household size was 3.14 and the average family size was 3.57.

29.7% of the population were under the age of 18, 2.2% from 18 to 24, 38.5% from 25 to 44, 23.1% from 45 to 64, and 6.6% who were 65 years of age or older. The median age was 36.3 years. For every 100 females, the population had 111.6 males. For every 100 females ages 18 and older there were 137.0 males.

=== 2000 census ===
As of the 2000 United States census, the population for ZIP Code Tabulation Area 07833 was 159.
