= Giani (disambiguation) =

Giani (or Gyani) is an honorific Sikh title used by someone learned in the Sikh religion and who often leads the congregation in prayers, such as Ardas, or in singing (kirtan).

Giani may also refer to:

== Given name ==
- Giani Kiriţă (born 1977), Romanian football player
- Giani Esposito (1930–1974), French film actor and singer-songwriter

== Surname ==
- Andrea Giani (born 1970), Italian coach and retired volleyball player
- Dario Giani (born 1938), Italian rower
- Domenico Giani (born 1962), Italian military, former officer of the Guardia di Finanza and current Inspector General of the Corpo della Gendarmeria, in Vatican City
- Emanuel Giani Ruset (1715–1794), Prince of Wallachia and Prince of Moldavia, also known as Emanuel Giani Manolache
- Felice Giani (1758–1823), Italian painter of the Neoclassic style
- Gastón Giani (born 1979), Argentine male volleyball player
- Harinder Singh Giani (1938-2007, Indian eminent jurist
- Harpreet Singh Giani, Indian-born lawyer based in London
- Ito Giani (1941–2018), Italian sprinter
- Justo Giani (born 1999), Argentine professional footballer
- Louis Giani (1934–2021), American wrestler
- Nicolas Giani (1986–2026), Italian football defender
- Sonal Giani, Indian LGBTQ rights activist

== Other uses ==
- ACS Cycling Chirio–Casa Giani (UCI Code: CHI), Italian professional cycling team based in Montechiaro d'Asti

== See also ==
- Gyan (disambiguation)
- Gianni, an Italian
