= Giannantonio =

Giannantonio is an Italian masculine blended given name that is a combination of Gianni and Antonio. Notable people known by this name include the following:

== Given name ==
- Giannantonio Lecchi or Giovanni Antonio Lecchi (1702 - 1776), Italian Jesuit and mathematician
- Giannantonio Moschini (1773 - 1840), Italian author and Roman Catholic priest
- Giannantonio Sperotto (born 1950), Italian football player
- Giannantonio Orsini, nickname of Giovanni Antonio Del Balzo Orsini (1386 or 1393 – 1463), Italian nobleman and military leader

== Surname ==
- Fabio Di Giannantonio (born 1998), Italian motorcycle racer
- John Giannantonio (born c. 1934), American gridiron football player

== See also ==
- Gian Antonio
- Gianantonio
