= Netcong =

Netcong may refer to the following in the U.S. state of New Jersey:

- Netcong, New Jersey, a Borough in Morris County
- Netcong (NJT station)
- Netcong Circle
- Netcong School District
