= Gianantonio =

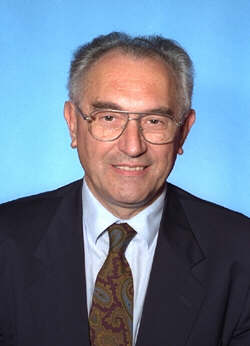
Gianantonio Mazzocchin XIII, an Italian politician.

Gianantonio is an Italian masculine blended given name that is a combination of Gianni and Antonio. Notable people known by this name include the following:

- Gianantonio Capizucchi (1515 – 1569), Italian Roman Catholic cardinal and bishop
- Gianantonio Da Re (born 1953), Italian politician
- Gianantonio Davia (1660 – 1740), Italian Roman Catholic cardinal
- Gianantonio Guardi, nickname of Giovanni Antonio Guardi (1699 – 1760), Italian painter and nobleman
- Gianantonio Serbelloni, nickname of Giovanni Antonio Serbelloni (1519–1591), Italian Cardinal
- Gianantonio Zopegni (1915 – 2003), Italian ice hockey player

== See also ==
- Gian Antonio
- Giannantonio
