= Gyan =

GYAN, Gyān, Gyaan or Gyan may refer to:

== People ==
- Gyan, one-half of the Indian musical duo Manoj–Gyan
- Gyan Evans (born 1960), Australian musician
- Gyan Prakash Pilania (born 1932), Indian social reformer
- Gyan Prakash (born 1952), historian of modern India
- Gyan Singh (disambiguation)
  - Gyan Singh (Fijian politician)
  - Gyan Singh (Indian politician)
- Asamoah Gyan (born 1985), Ghanaian footballer
- Baffour Gyan (born 1980), Ghanaian footballer
- Christian Gyan (1978-2021), Ghanaian footballer
- Kiki Gyan (1957-2004), Ghanaian musician

== Other uses ==
- Jnana, a Sanskrit word that roughly translates to 'knowledge' in English
- Global Youth Action Network, a youth empowerment organization
- Gyan (album), the debut album by Gyan Evans

== See also ==
- GIAN (disambiguation)
- Gian, a given name
