= Gian Antonio =

Gian Antonio is a masculine blended given name that is a combination of Gianni and Antonio. Notable people known by this name include the following:

- Gian Antonio Fassano (?? – 1568), Italian Roman Catholic prelate
- Gian Antonio Grassi (?? – 1602), Italian Roman Catholic prelate
- Gian Antonio Selva (1751 - 1819), Italian neoclassical architect
- Gian Antonio Serbelloni, nickname of Giovanni Antonio Serbelloni (1519–1591), Italian Cardinal

== See also ==
- Gianantonio
- Giannantonio
