= Gianni (surname) =

Gianni is an Italian surname. Notable people with the surname include:

- Alberto Gianni (1891–1930), Italian diver
- Armando Umberto Gianni (1939–2026), Italian-born Roman Catholic bishop
- Dimitrie Gianni (1838–1902), Romanian politician
- Gary Gianni (born 1954), American comics artist
- Lapo Gianni (died after 1328), Italian poet
- Mario Gianni (1902–1967), Italian footballer
- Matthieu Gianni (born 1985), French footballer
- Nicolás Gianni (born 1982), Argentine footballer
- Patrizia Gianni (born 1952), Italian mathematician
- Paul Gianni, Australian paralympic athlete

== See also ==
- Gianni
- Di Gianni
