= Pratap Singh Giani =

Sikh academic and calligraphist

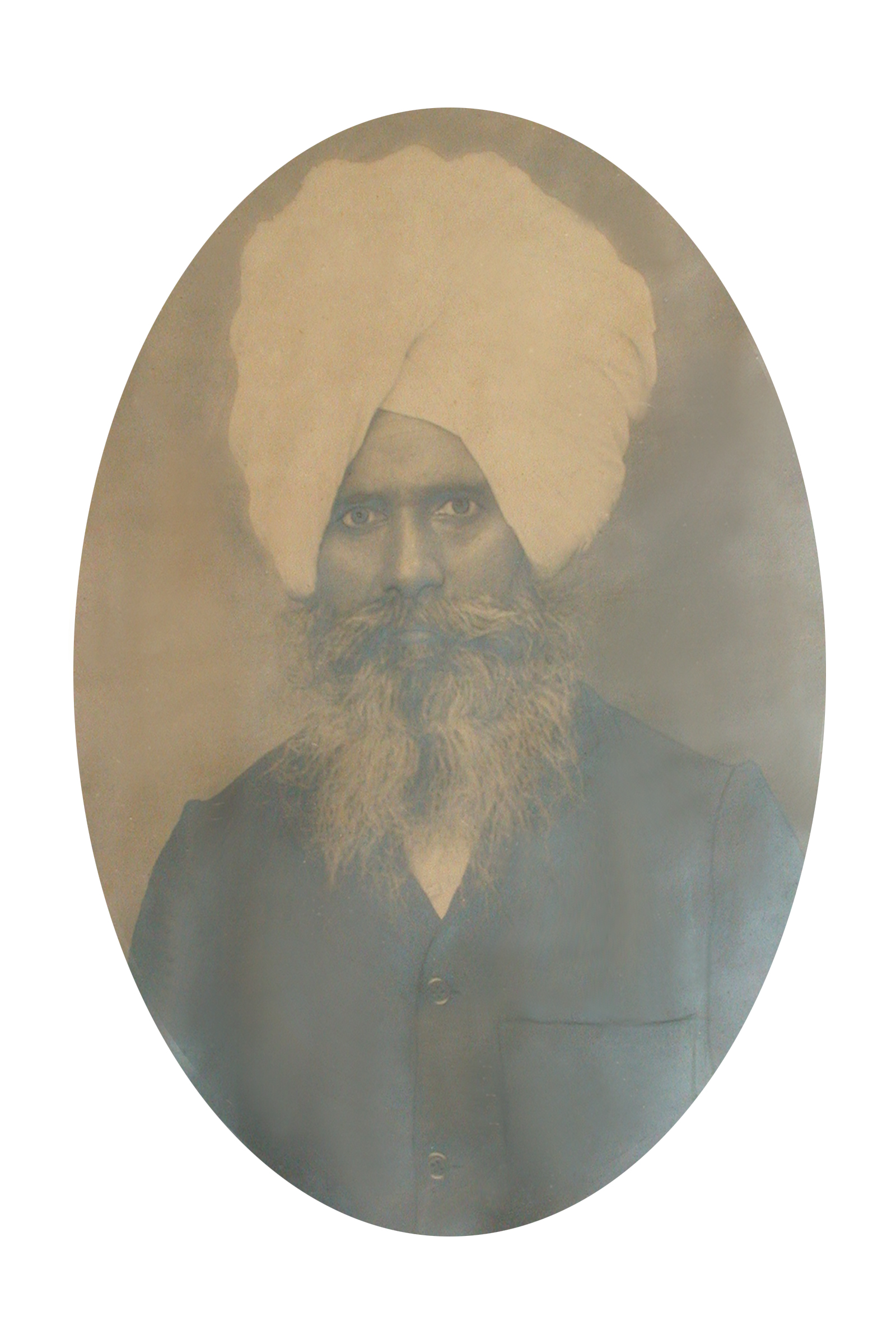
- Pronunciation: pratāpa sigha, kathākāra
- Born: 1855; Lahore, Punjab, British India
- Died: 20 July 1920 (aged 64–65)

Pratap Singh Giani (also Partap Singh Gyani, 1855–1920) was a Sikh academic, scholar and calligraphist.

== Life ==
He was born in 1855, the son of Bhai Bhag Singh Giani of Lahore (Gurmukhi: ਭਾਈ ਭਾਗ ਸਿੰਘ ਲਾਹੌਰ). As a young boy, Partap Singh learnt Punjabi, Urdu and Sanskrit and studied Sikh scriptures. In 1884, he accompanied Thakur Singh Sandhanvalia to England to read the Guru Granth Sahib to the deposed Sikh ruler of the Punjab, Maharaja Duleep Singh and to re-convert him to Sikhism. Partap Singh remained in England for six months. On return to India, he worked as a granthi (scripture-reader) at Gurdwara Kaulsar in Amritsar. When Maharaja Duleep Singh was due to come back to India, Partap Singh accompanied Thakur Singh and his sons to Delhi with the intention of going to Bombay to receive the Maharajah. On hearing the news of Duleep Singh's detention at Aden, Partap Singh returned to Amritsar while Thakur Singh proceeded to Pondicherry. At Amritsar, Partap Singh worked secretly for Thakur Singh distributing his pro-Duleep Singh letters among his confidants and friends. Towards the close of 1887, he was arrested at Amritsar and sent to Lahore jail. He escaped from prison and, turning a sadhu, travelled to different parts of the country in the company of holy men.

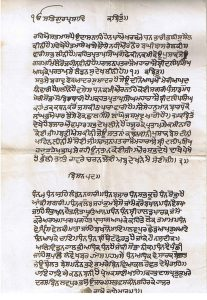
Handwritten travel memoir written in a poetic form of Punjabi by Giani Pratap Singh recalling his visit to London to see Duleep Singh in 1882

During one such journey he happened to meet Max Arthur Macauliffe, then engaged in translating the Sikh scripture into English.

Macauliffe was impressed by his learning and wished that he would assist him in his work. Partap Singh, who had introduced himself under the assumed name of “Bava Ishar Das”, revealed thereupon his identity to him. Macauliffe interceded with the government on his behalf and had the warrants of his arrest withdrawn in January 1889.

Partap Singh settled down in a house in Kaulsar near Baba Atal, in Amritsar, and for several years performed katha expounding the Holy Writ in front of the Akal Bung.

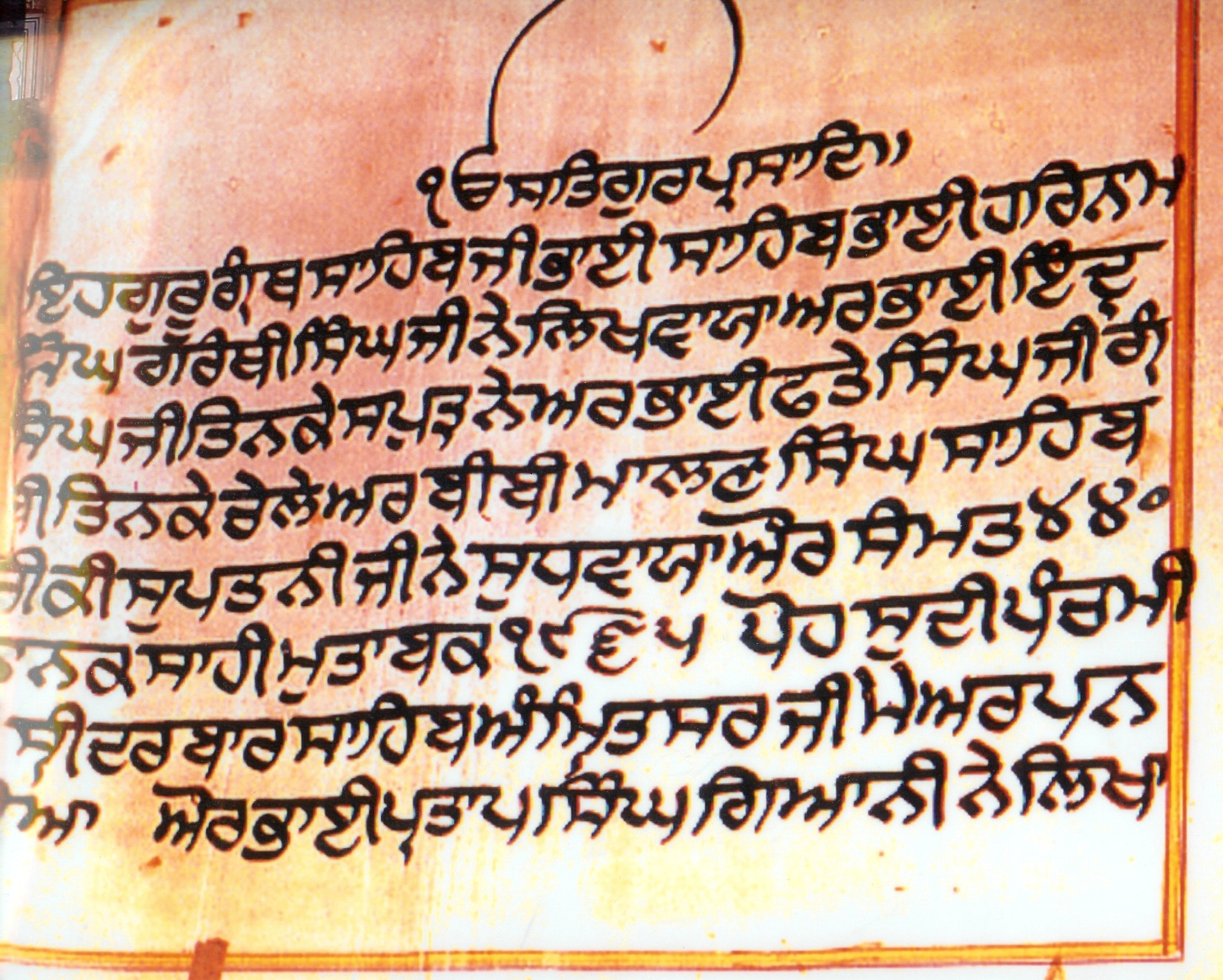
The Bir of Guru Granth Sahib, scribed by Pratap Singh

A fine calligraphist, Partap Singh transcribed volumes of the Guru Granth Sahib, the most famous of them being the one still preserved in the Harimandir Sahib. This copy, completed in 1908, is written in very bold Gurmukhi characters on large-sized 25" by 28" sheets of Kashmiri paper and is installed on the first floor of the Harimandir Sahib where it is used for the recital of akhand paths or unbroken readings of the Guru Granth Sahib. The entire volume, 1527 leaves, that is, 8054 pages, with double borders in red, blue and yellow, is written in Giani Pratap Singh's hand and is known as Vadde Baba Ji (largesized Holy Volume). The name of the scribe is mentioned at the end of the text, on a separate sheet. Volumes of the Holy Books transcribed by Giani Partap Singh are also preserved at Baba Atal and Takht Sri Hazur Sahib, Nanded.

In 1902, Partap Singh joined Aitchison College, also known as Chiefs College, Lahore, as granthi and instructor. According to the records of the college, he was employed initially at a salary of Rupees 5 per month, which was later increased to Rupees 50 per month from 1904. He taught in this college as a Sikh religious teacher till his death in 1920.

== Legacy ==
According to Panjaba Phain, August 1916 issue, he was the first secretary of the Sanatan Singh Sabha (also referred to as Amritsar Singh Sabha). He was also editor of the earliest published Sikh newspaper Akal Prakash, which made its first appearance in 1876. He is also said to have translated into Punjabi Major Evans Bell's book, The Annexation of the Punjab and Maharaja Duleep Singh. Pratap Singh died at Lahore on 20 July 1920.

Pratap Singh's son Kartar Singh Giani was a lawyer at Amritsar and was later a member of the Sikh Gurudwara Judicial Commission. His grandsons Harinder Singh Giani and Narinder Singh Gyani were lawyers practicing in the Punjab and Haryana High Court at Chandigarh and Amritsar. His great-grandson Harpreet Singh Giani is an advocate and a barrister currently practicing in the Punjab and Haryana High Court in India and in England and Wales.
