= Ken Hall (American football) =

American football player (1935–2025)

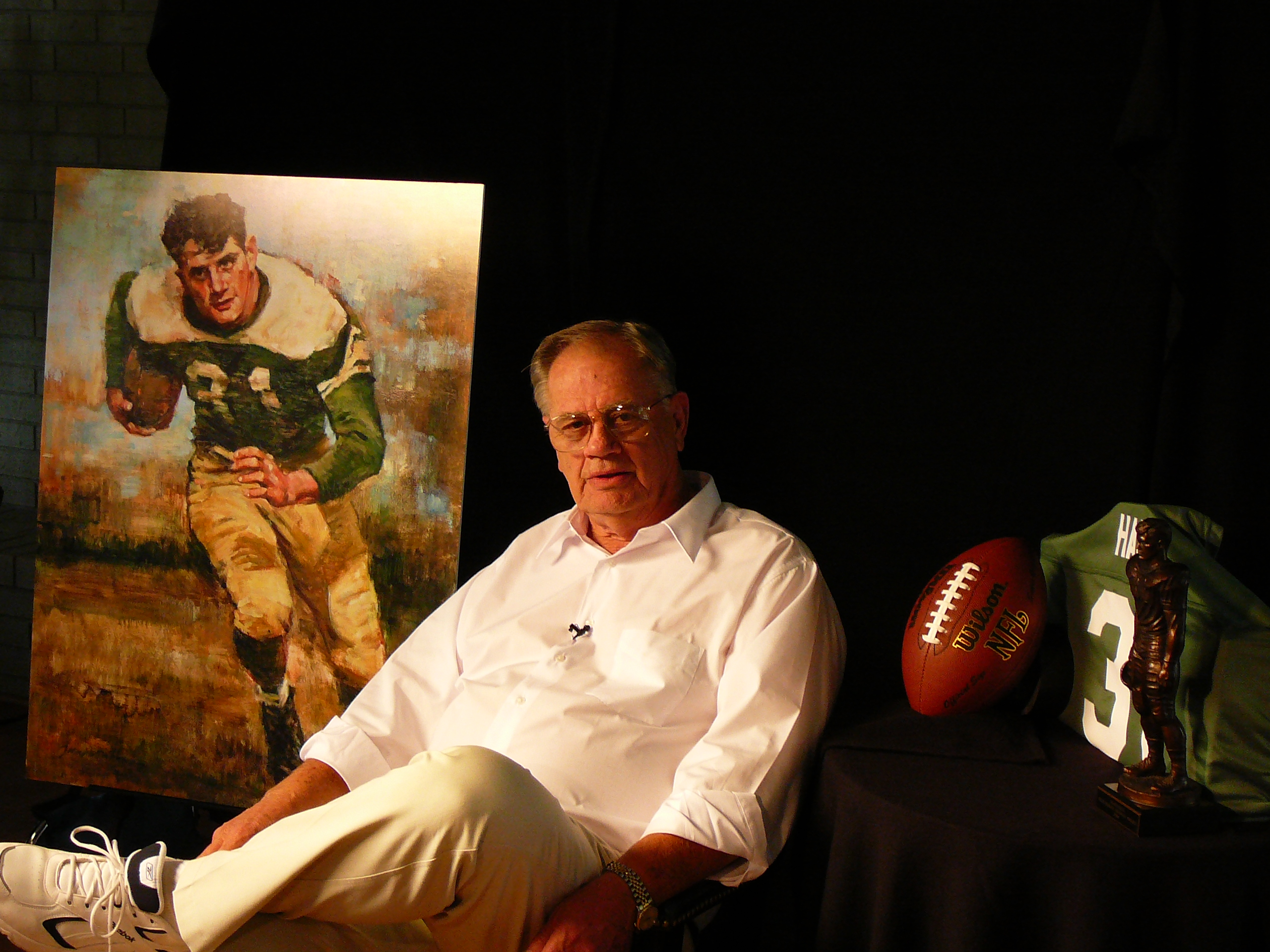

No. 82, 22, 21, 20
- Positions: Halfback, Punter

Personal information
- Born: December 13, 1935; Madisonville, Texas, U.S.
- Died: March 1, 2025 (aged 89)
- Listed height: 6 ft 1 in (1.85 m)
- Listed weight: 205 lb (93 kg)

Career information
- High school: Sugar Land (Sugar Land, Texas)
- College: Texas A&M (1954–1956)
- NFL draft: 1958: 14th round, 165th overall pick

Career history
- Edmonton Eskimos (1957); Chicago Cardinals (1959); Houston Oilers (1960–1961); St. Louis Cardinals (1961)

Awards and highlights
- 2× AFL champion (1960, 1961)

Career NFL/AFL statistics
- Rushing yards: 212
- Rushing average: 4.2
- Receptions: 8
- Receiving yards: 118
- Total touchdowns: 4
- Stats at Pro Football Reference

Charles Kenneth Hall (December 13, 1935 – March 2025), nicknamed "Sugar Land Express", was an American professional football player in the Canadian Football League (CFL), National Football League (NFL) and American Football League (AFL). Playing for the Sugar Land High School Gators (Sugar Land, Texas) from 1950 to 1953, Hall established 17 national football records, several of which still stand.

== Early life ==
Hall's career prep rushing record of 11,232 yards (1950: 569 yd; 1951: 3,160 yd; 1952: 3,458 yd; 1953: 4,045 yd) stood until 2012, when it was broken by Derrick Henry (Yulee, Fl.), while his single-season rushing record had been broken in 1996 by Travis Henry (Frostproof, Fl.). His 32.9 points per game (1953/12) remains a national record. His record of (38) 100-yard games was tied by Steve Worster of Bridge City, Tx. in 1966, but was not broken until the mid-1980s by Emmitt Smith (Escambia, Fl.), whose record later was broken in 2011 by Rushel Shell of Hopewell, Pa. Hall also finished his career with 14,558 yards of total offense (11,232 rushing/3,326 passing), a record that would last until being broken by future Major League Baseball player J. R. House (Nitro, WV) in 1998.

At Sugar Land, Hall played in the single-wing formation at quarterback, standing 6 ft 1 in (1.85 m) and weighing in at 190 lb (86 kg). According to the National High School Sports Record Book, Hall still holds multiple single-season records, including average points per game (32.9), touchdowns per game (4.8) and rushing yards per game (337.1).

In a single contest against Houston Lutheran High School in 1953, Hall averaged 47.3 yards on 11 carries for 520 yards (the state record for nearly 25 years, currently 4th), returned a punt 82 yards, a kickoff run of 64 yards and snatched a 21-yard interception for a combined 687 total yards.

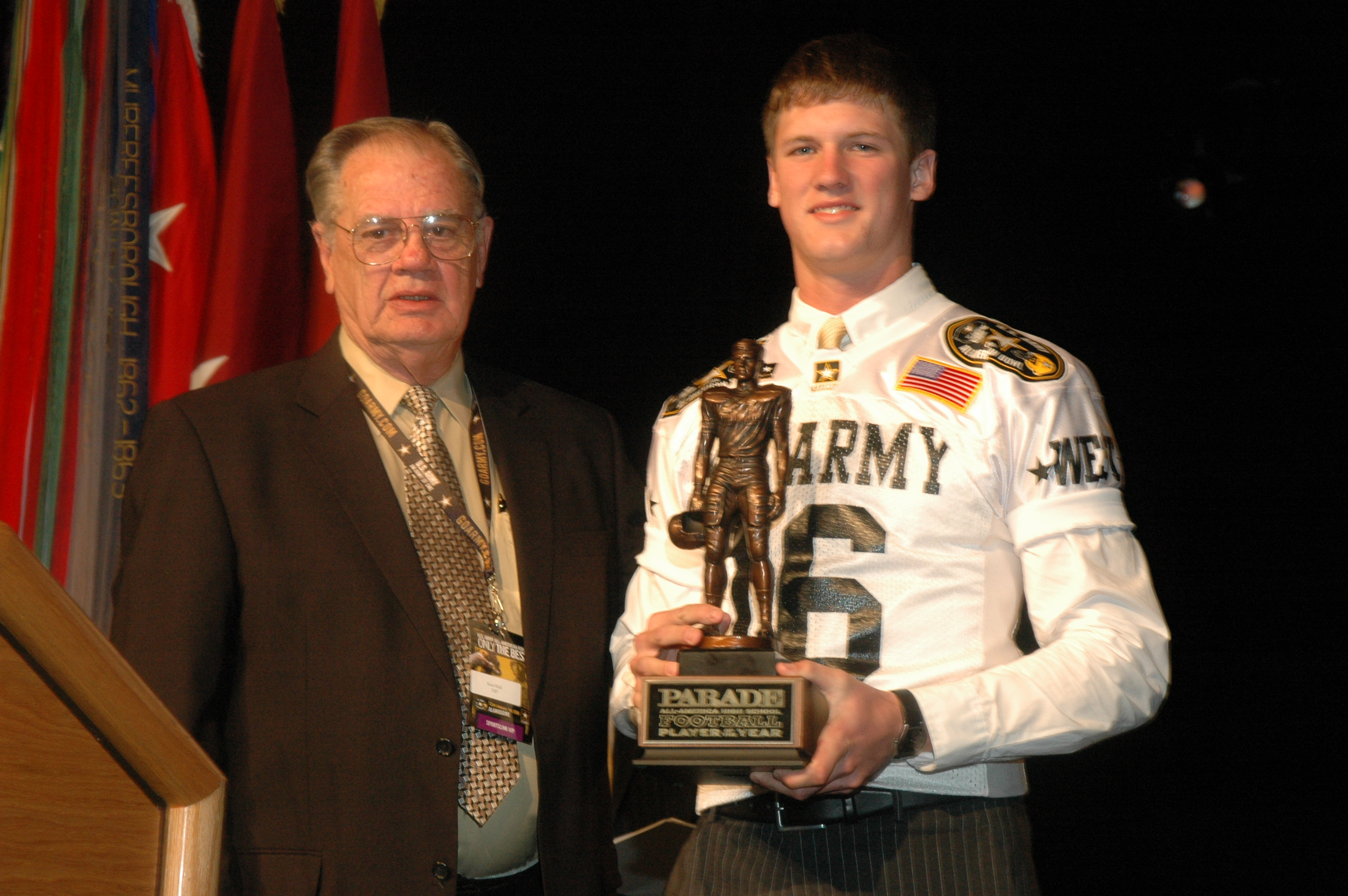
Hall, with Mitch Mustain (2005)

== College career ==
Hall was recruited by several schools, and chose to attend Texas A&M under college coach Paul "Bear" Bryant. He quit before his college's team went to the Junction, Texas, training camp and got married.

== Professional career ==
Hall played in the Canadian Football League and for various National Football League teams between 1957 and 1961. On October 23, 1960, Hall averaged 65.33 yards per kickoff return for the Houston Oilers against the New York Titans, 3rd highest on the all time individual NFL record books for highest average kickoff return yardage, game (minimum of at least three returns).

He played in 34 total games, serving as a half back and occasional punter. He rushed for 212 total career yards on 51 carries, with 8 receptions for 118 yards and 2 touchdowns. He made 11 punt returns for 164 yards and a touchdown, as well as 31 kick returns for 833 yards and one touchdown. He punted 14 times for 448 yards.

== Death ==
On March 14, 2025, it was announced that Hall had died at the age of 89.

== Legacy and honors ==
In 1983, Hall was placed in the National High School Hall of Fame. Hall also belonged to the Texas High School Football Hall of Fame and the Texas Sports Hall of Fame. In 1999, Hall was honored by All American Games with the creation of the Hall Trophy. The Hall Trophy (molded in Hall's likeness) is presented annually to an outstanding football player on a nationwide level. Some past winners include Chris Leak, Adrian Peterson, Mitch Mustain, and Terrelle Pryor. During the 1980s, Hall was sales manager for Sweetener Products Company, a large wholesale sugar distributor in Southern California. He lived in Fredericksburg, Texas.

== Records ==
Hall still holds the following Texas state records:

- Single-season rushing yards (4,045/1953; this was accomplished in 12 games, and Hall remains the only Texas running back to rush for over 4,000 yards in one year)
- Rushing per game (337.1 yards/1953/12)
- Points per game (32.9/1953/12)
- Career rushing (11,232 yards/1950–53)

== See also ==
- U.S. Army Player of the Year Award
- John Giannantonio
