= Netcong High School =

School in New Jersey, United States

Coordinates: 40.8996°N 74.6992°W

Netcong High School was a high school in Netcong in Morris County, in the U.S. state of New Jersey. In 1969 the school had 390 students. It was a part of the Netcong School District.

== History ==
Netcong High first opened in the 1900s.

In 1969, students protested after New Jersey courts ended a prayer program. The school administration stated the prayer was student-organized and voluntary. New Jersey courts argued that it violated Engel v. Vitale (1962). Judge Joseph Stamler of New Jersey Superior Court issued a decision in February 1970 in the case State Board of Education v. Board of Education of Netcong, New Jersey regarding a policy under which the district's school board provided for voluntary readings at the start of the school day at the high school of prayers that had been published in the Congressional Record, as delivered by Chaplain of the United States House of Representatives. Attendance at these readings was voluntary, and the board said that they were intended as inspirational remarks, rather than prayer in the schools. In his decision, Judge Stamler prohibited what he described as a "subterfuge [that] is degrading to all religions", arguing that by taking what were "beautiful prayers" and referring to them merely as "remarks", the school district was working to "peddle religion in a very cheap manner under an assumed name." The New Jersey Supreme Court unanimously affirmed Stamler's decision and the United States Supreme Court refused to hear an appeal from the district's school board.

The school closed in 1974 and the building became Netcong Elementary School. The closing was voluntary; it was prompted by Sparta asking Byram Township to end the sending/receiving relationship due to overcrowing at their high school. Lenape Valley Regional High School in Stanhope now serves as the public high school for Netcong residents.

== Notable alumni ==
- John Giannantonio (born c. 1934) set several national high school football records, many which still stand as of 2016. As a 5 ft 7 in (1.70 m), 137 lb (62 kg) sophomore in 1950, Giannantonio rushed for 4,756 yards and 41 touchdowns over the team's eight-game season. During a game in November that season against Mountain Lakes High School he rushed for 754 yards and nine touchdowns in a 61–0 win. His 594.5 rushing yards per game average, season rushing yards total, and single-game rushing yards against Mountain Lakes remain national high school records as of 2016.
