= Harpreet Singh Giani =

Indian-born English lawyer

Harpreet Singh Giani is an Indian-born lawyer based in London, England.

== Biography ==
Harpreet Singh Giani was born in India into a Punjabi Sikh family. He is the son of the lawyer Harinder Singh Giani from Chandigarh and the grandson of the Sikh scholar and calligraphist, Pratap Singh Giani.

Giani completed his initial education at the DAV College, Chandigarh. He then obtained a Bachelor's degree in Law from Panjab University at Chandigarh, and was admitted to the bar in 1999. After practising for a few years, he chose to pursue further studies and earned a Master of Business Laws degree from the National Law School of India University, Bangalore (2004). He then took up a Master of Laws (International Law) from the London School of Economics (2006). Immediately after taking the latter degree, he was called to the bar of England and Wales in 2006 at Gray's Inn. In India, he is in independent practice in Chandigarh and in England & Wales, he practices from Libertas Chambers.

Giani is also an alumnus of the Hague Academy of International Law (2003) and the International Institute of Higher Studies in Criminal Sciences, Siracusa, Italy (2008) where he studied Shariat (Islamic) law.

On 5 December 2014 Giani was admitted into the Freedom of the City of London

Giani is the author of The Blood Bankers' Legal Handbook (2003).

== Controversy ==
The Liberhan Commission was appointed by the Government of India in December 1992 to inquire into the circumstances surrounding the demolition of the Babri Masjid earlier the same month. Six years after the commission was formed, Giani accepted the responsibility of serving as the Commission's Counsel. He joined the Commission in 1998, after the previous Counsel had resigned. Giani worked on the final report, which was handed over to the Indian Prime Minister Manmohan Singh and Home Minister P. Chidambaram by Justice Liberhan and Giani. A further 11 years later, on 30 June 2009. Giani remained the Commission's Counsel for over a year and a half, till the Commission was wound up with the submission of the report.

In the parliamentary debate in the lower house of the Indian Parliament, Members of Parliament Pinaki Mishra and Sushma Swaraj stated that they believed that the report had in fact been written by Giani rather than Chief Justice Manmohan Singh Liberhan. In the upper house of parliament, Member of Parliament Arun Jaitley similarly claimed that

Admittedly, it was Shri Giani who has analyzed the evidence, come to conclusions, edited the report, modified the language, added and modified the ideas. The judge seems only to have done the rest, if anything remained. The Liberhan – Giani report is the first Example of ‘Judgment Outsourcing’.
