= Liberhan Commission =

Long-running inquiry commissioned by the Government of India

The Liberhan Commission (officially Liberhan Ayodhya Commission of Inquiry) was a long-running inquiry commissioned by the Government of India to investigate the destruction of the disputed Babri Masjid in Ayodhya in 1992. Led by retired High Court Judge M. S. Liberhan, it was formed on 16 December 1992 by an order of the Indian Home Union Ministry after the demolition of the Babri Masjid on 6 December and the subsequent riots there. The commission was originally mandated to submit its report within three months. Extensions were given 48 times, and after a delay of 17 years, the one-man commission submitted the report to Prime Minister Manmohan Singh on 30 June 2009. In November 2009, a day after a newspaper published the allegedly leaked contents of the report, the report was tabled in Parliament by the Home Minister P. Chidambaram.

== Dispute ==
The Babri Masjid (Mosque of Babur) was a mosque in Ayodhya on Ramkot Hill. It was destroyed in 1992 when a political rally developed into a riot involving 150,000 people, Despite a commitment to the Indian Supreme Court by the rally organisers that the mosque would not be harmed. More than 2000 people were killed in ensuing riots in many major Indian cities including Mumbai, and Delhi.

The mosque was constructed in 1527 by order of Babur, the first Mughal emperor of India on top of a destroyed Ram temple. Before the 1940s, the mosque was called Masjid-i-Janmasthan ("mosque of the birthplace"). Babur's commander-in-chief, Mir Baqi, destroyed an existing temple at the site which commemorated the birthplace of Lord Rama, an incarnation of Lord Vishnu and ruler of Ayodhya. The political, historical and socio-religious debate over the history and location of the Babri Mosque and whether a previous temple was demolished or modified to create it, is known as the Ayodhya Debate.

== Terms and reference of the commission ==
To make an inquiry with respect to the following matters:

1. The sequence of events leading to, and all the facts and circumstances relating to, the occurrences in the Ram Janma Bhoomi-Babri Masjid complex at Ayodhya on 6 December 1992 involving the destruction of the Ram Janma Bhoomi-Babri Masjid structure.
2. The role played by the Chief Minister, Members of the Council of Ministers, officials of the Government of Uttar Pradesh and by the individuals, concerned organisations and agencies in, or in connection with, the destruction of the Ram Janma Bhoomi-Babri Masjid structure;
3. The deficiencies in security measures and other arrangements as prescribed or operated in practice by the Government of Uttar Pradesh which might have contributed to the events that took place in the Ram Janma Bhoomi-Babri Masjid complex, Ayodhya town and Faizabad on 6 December 1992;
4. The sequence of events leading to, and all the facts and circumstances relating to, the assault on media persons at Ayodhya on 6 December 1992; and
5. Any other matters related to the subject of Inquiry.

== Duration and expenses ==
The one-man panel, one of the country's longest-running inquiry commissions, cost the government ₹80 million (US$830,000) and wrote the report on the sequence of events leading to the destruction of the Babri mosque by Hindu mobs on 6 December 1992 and the other issues mentioned in terms of reference.

Appointed by former prime minister P.V. Narasimha Rao two weeks after the demolition on 6 December 1992, to ward off criticism against his government for having failed to protect the mosque, the commission in August 2005 finished hearing its last witness Kalyan Singh – who was Uttar Pradesh chief minister at the time of the demolition and resigned soon after.

In 16 years of its proceedings, the commission recorded statements of several politicians, bureaucrats and police officials including Kalyan Singh, late Narasimha Rao, former deputy prime minister L.K. Advani and his colleagues Murli Manohar Joshi and Uma Bharati as well as Mulayam Singh Yadav.

Top bureaucrats and police officials of Uttar Pradesh, the then district magistrate R.N. Srivastava and Senior Superintendent of Police D.B. Roy of Ayodhya also recorded their statements on the demolition. In all, the Commission examined one hundred witnesses including

1. Mark Tully, BBC Journalist
2. PR Kumaramangalam, Union Minister
3. SB Chavan, Union Home Minister
4. Uma Bharti, BJP leader
5. KS Sudarshan, RSS leader
6. Jyoti Basu, CPI(M) leader, member of the National Integration Council
7. Murli Manohar Joshi, President, Bharatiya Janta Party, member of the Rajya Sabha
8. LK Advani, Leader, Bharatiya Janta Party
9. Vinay Katyar, Member of Parliament, Bharatiya Janta Party
10. Vishnu Hari Dalmia, President, Vishwa Hindu Parishad
11. VP Singh, Former Prime Minister, leader of Janta Dal
12. Kalyan Singh, the then Chief Minister, of Uttar Pradesh
13. P. V. Narasimha Rao, Prime Minister of India
14. Tej Shankar, Supreme Court's observer in Ayodhya
15. Arjun Singh, Union Cabinet Minister, Union Human Resource and Development
16. Swami Sachidanand Sakshi, alias Sakshiji Maharaj, BJP Member of Parliament, Acharya of the Nirmal Panchayati Akhara, Haridwar
17. Ashok Singhal, Leader, Vishwa Hindu Parishad
18. Kalraj Mishra, President, Uttar Pradesh unit of Bharatiya Janta Party
19. Mahant Paramhans Ramchander Das, President, Ram Janambhoomi Nyas
20. Mulayam Singh Yadav, Former Chief Minister, Uttar Pradesh
21. Madhav Godbole, Union Home Secretary

Four years ago, the hearings of the Commission concluded but not before a controversy broke out with the sole Commission's Counsel Anupam Gupta dissociating himself from it owing to personal differences with Justice Liberhan. Advani, Joshi, Bharti and Kalyan Singh, who was the BJP Chief Minister at the time of demolition, appeared before the commission as witnesses. Kalyan Singh appeared only after the Delhi High Court lifted a stay order on his deposition.

Other former officials against whom criminal cases are pending in the demolition of the disputed structure in Ayodhya include Bajrang Dal's, Vinay Katiyar.

Even before the findings of the commission were out, Congress and BJP leaders clashed over the issue.

== The contents of the report ==
On 23 November 2009, the media began reporting on the contents of the report, which had been leaked before being made available to the legislature. It indicted top Bharatiya Janata Party (BJP) leaders as being actively involved in the meticulous planning of the demolition of the mosque. It was a day of angry exchanges in parliament and cries of "Shame, shame!" in the Lok Sabha as the opposition accused the Home Ministry of deliberately leaking the report. The Parliament session had to be adjourned for the day. Parliament delayed the discussion of the report and the accompanying Action Taken Report (ATR), which contained mostly recommendations, until 22 December 2009.

The report was finally discussed and debated in the Parliament after a delay caused by demands from some members of the Parliament for the Hindi-translated version of the report. The Lok Sabha debated the report on 8 November 2009 and the Rajya Sabha followed on 10 and 11 November.

The report holds 68 people culpable, including L K Advani, Murli Manohar Joshi, Atal Bihari Vajpayee and more critically, Kalyan Singh, the then-Chief Minister of Uttar Pradesh. The report accused the RSS of being the chief architect of the demolition and names it as the core of the Sangh Parivar.

The commission has identified the Kalyan Singh-led BJP government in Uttar Pradesh as the key to the execution of the conspiracy to demolish Babri Masjid. Justice M S Liberhan termed Atal Bihari Vajpayee, L K Advani, Murli Manohar Joshi as pseudo-moderates, pretending to keep a distance from the Ram Janmabhoomi campaign when they were actually aware of the whole conspiracy. The report said, "They have violated the trust of the people.... There can be no greater betrayal or crime in a democracy and this Commission has no hesitation in condemning these pseudo-moderates for their sins of omission".

== Findings ==
Kalyan Singh, who was the Chief Minister of Uttar Pradesh during the mosque's demolition, was harshly criticized in the report. He was accused of posting bureaucrats and police officers who would stay silent during the mosque's demolition in Ayodhya. Indicting the BJP government in Uttar Pradesh, the one-man commission said in its report: "Kalyan Singh's government was the essential component needed by the Sangh Parivar for its purposes. Kalyan Singh lived up to the expectations of the Parivar".

The commission's report said that Singh and his Cabinet allowed the Rashtriya Swayamsevak Sangh (RSS) to directly run his government. It also stated that the government had "systematically and in a pre-planned manner removed inconvenient bureaucrats from positions of power, dismantled and diluted the security apparatus and infrastructure, lied consistently to the high court and the Supreme Court of India and to the people of India to evade constitutional governance and thus betrayed the confidence of the electorate".

The Liberhan Commission stated about the demolition:

"The preparation was accomplished with phenomenal secrecy, was technically flawless with consistency and assured results.... The theme was power. It attracted clusters of young men to support the hidden agenda. Leaders know how passions are aroused and how to prevent the same; they however always see what would be beneficial to them rather than what would be good for the nation. This is what happened in Ayodhya."

To the commission's observation that the demolition was planned, Chapter 1: page no 15, para 7.4 of the report wherein it admits: "No evidence, lead or information was provided to the commission with respect to the conspiracy or pre-planning or the joint common enterprise by any of these counsels... (of the Muslim organisations)".

Moreover, the commission noted (at page 782, para 130.24) that, "...Home Secretary Godbole stated that there was no information of planning and as such it could not be inferred that there was a conspiracy of the Congress and BJP for demolition."

"The chief minister and his cabinet were the proverbial insiders who caused the collapse of the entire system."

Singh allegedly maintained a "studied silence" even at the height of the crisis in December 1992 and "refused to allow even a single measure which might impede the Ayodhya campaign or prevent the assault on the disputed structures, the journalists or the innocent people."

He allegedly did not direct the police "to use force or resort to firing to chase away the miscreants or to save the lives of those wretched innocents..." even though he was alerted that the mosque had been demolished and rioters were attacking Muslims in Ayodhya.

"The wanton violence against human life and property continued unabated and even at that late stage, the chief minister did not use the central forces which could have been swiftly deployed", the report further states.

Uma Bharti, Govindacharya, Kalyan Singh and Shanker Singh Vaghela, all of whom were members of the BJP then, are held primarily responsible for the destruction of the mosque and the report says that they could have prevented the assault. Senior BJP leaders Atal Bihari Vajpayee, Lal Krishna Advani and Murli Manohar Joshi are called "pseudo-moderates". The report holds them intellectually and ideologically responsible for the mosque's destruction. The report says that they gave false assurances to court, people and the nation. Vajpayee, Prime Minister in the BJP-led National Democratic Alliance, was not present on 6 December 1992 when the mosque was brought down, but the report says it cannot be assumed that Vajpayee, Advani and others did not know of the designs of the Sangh Parivar.

The Report, headed by Justice Liberhan, contained no criticism of the 1992 Indian government and then Prime Minister P V Narasimha Rao. and supports Rao's stand that legally and constitutionally, the central government could not impose President's Rule in the state of Uttar Pradesh in December 1992.

The report submitted by Justice Liberhan has come under severe criticism for being biased and rhetorical in nature. It has been pointed out that, the report also noted (in para 18.3 on page 63) that "although, there was no order restraining the Muslims from going to the disputed structure or from offering namaz therein either by the judiciary or from the administration, yet namaz was not offered at the disputed structure since 1934. No processions were taken out inside the disputed structure nor any grave dug there about."

Justice Liberhan has agreed that "Ayodhya is accepted in popular Hindu tradition as the birthplace of Lord Rama and is therefore regarded as a holy and historical city" and "ancient Ayodhya was traditionally the epitome of Hindu life, culture and a paradigm of coexistence of a multi-religious society. It was a peaceful place with a regular influx of visitors, pilgrims, sadhus and sants, monks, travellers, tourists."

BJP president Rajnath Singh will open the debate on the Liberhan Commission report in the Lok Sabha while Leader of Opposition in Rajya Sabha Arun Jaitley is expected to lead the party charge in the Rajya Sabha. The Lok Sabha debated the report on 1 December 2009 and the Rajya Sabha on 7 December 2009. The BJP had initially decided to field Sushma Swaraj as the lead speaker in the Lower House, but she will now be the second speaker on the issue. The performance of its star speakers in both Houses will be keenly watched by the RSS, say party sources. While the initial plan would have seen the quartet of Delhi BJP leaders – Jaitley, Sushma Swaraj, in addition to Venkaiah Naidu, and Ananth Kumar – holding forth on the Ayodhya debate, sources say that Rajnath, whose term as party president technically ends on 26 November 2009, "didn't want to be left out of the debate".

Speaking in the Parliament, Jaitley led the charge against the report and against Justice Liberhan personally. Jaitley suggested that Justice Liberhan may not have actually authored the report and, reiterating what Sushma Swaraj had read out in the Lok Sabha, citing from page 999 of the report, commented that Justice Liberhan had credited Commission's Counsel Harpreet Singh Giani with helping with the analysis, conclusions, editing and language and therefore called it the "Liberhan-Giani" report. He charged the report with "factual hallucinations". He cited the incorrect date of Mahatma Gandhi's assassination as well as the inclusion of the names of some historians in the report as evidence.

== RSS, VHP factor ==
The Liberhan report has been very critical of mass Hindu organizations, especially the RSS. It says that demolition of Babri in Ayodhya has been a longtime objective of the RSS. It accuses RSS of utilizing its large volunteer base to accomplish this task. The RSS has always maintained that the demolition was spontaneous. The report suggests otherwise.

The Sangh Parivar is a "highly successful and corporatised model of a political party" and as the Ayodhya campaign demonstrated, has developed a highly efficient organisational structure, the Liberhan Commission said in its report.

It said the BJP "was and remains an appendage of the RSS, which had the purpose only of providing an acceptable veneer to the less popular decisions and a facade for the brash members of the Sangh Parivar".

The commission, observed, "The blame or the credit for the entire temple construction movement at Ayodhya must necessarily be attributed to the Sangh Parivar".

It noted that the Sangh Parivar is an "extensive and widespread organic body", which encompasses organisations, which address and assimilate just about every type of social, professional and other demographic grouping of individuals.

"Each time, a new demographic group has emerged, the Sangh Parivar has hived off some of its RSS inner-core leadership to harness that group and bring it within the fold, enhancing the voter base of the Parivar."

=== Open secrets ===
A book authored by a former senior Indian intelligence officer revealed that demolition of the historic Babri Mosque at Ayodhya was planned 10 months in advance by Hindu extremist leaders of Rashtriya Sevak Sang (RSS), Bharatiya Janta Party (BJP) and Vishwa Hindu Parishad (VHP). The author, a former Intelligence Bureau Joint Director, Maloy Krishna Dhar in his book "Open Secrets-India's intelligence unveiled" pointed out that the blueprint for demolition of the mosque was drawn in a meeting held in February 1992 attended by leaders of the extremist Hindu groups.

The leaders agreed to work together. They always maintained that demolition was unprecedented and top leaders had tried to hold back the Karsevaks. He goes on to say that in a meeting on the previous day, the RSS, VHP, BJP and Shiv Sena leaders there was "silent resoluteness and agreement that Ayodhya offered a unique opportunity to take the Hindutva wave to the peak for deriving political benefit. The iron was hot and this was the time to hit."

Dhar merged with the huge crowd as a journalist and found Shiv Sena activists engaged in vandalism and RSS members inflaming everyone." L.K. Advani had spat fire from the pulpit but he failed to control the flames. Taped videos substantiated that he was progenitor of the tsunami effect that he failed to control at the vital moment of destiny," says Dhar claiming to have made a videotape and 70 still photos.

=== RSS defence ===
Seeking to distance Hindu organisations from the Babri Mosque demolition, RSS chief K C Sudershan said that the Babri Mosque was demolished by government men and not by the Karsevaks. "The mosque was demolished by the government men and not by the Karsevaks," he said while addressing a gathering of RSS cadre and public at a meeting. Without mentioning whether he was referring to the Kalyan Singh-led-BJP government in power in Uttar Pradesh or the Congress regime at Centre then, he said he was present at Ayodhya and wanted to construct the Ram Temple at an undisputed place but they could not do so as the government men demolished Babri Mosque on 6 December 1992. Sudershan, who spoke in a three-day function of RSS Madhya Bharat Pranth, said that under a conspiracy, the names of the Hindu Organisations like Vishwa Hindu Parishad (VHP) and Bajrang Dal (BD) were dragged in bringing down the structure.

He contested Liberhan Commission's claim that demolition of the Babri Mosque was planned and charged "dilly-dally" by the then government of Prime Minister P V Narasimha Rao was responsible for the incident.

"It was not a planned incident. Because of the dilly-dallying attitude by the then Prime Minister and delay in court judgements, things went out of control as lakhs of people gathered at Ayodhya for kar seva," Sudarshan told a press conference.

He claimed when the people, who had climbed the canopy of the disputed structure, were unable to break it with heavy hammers and 'saabal' (long iron rod), the armed forces personnel present there caused the damage to its walls by triggering an explosive. Once the walls collapsed, the entire canopy of the Babri mosque caved in, he said. He claimed a powerful Congress leader of Maharashtra, whose name he did not disclose, had told him at senior BJP leader late K R Malkani's house in Delhi that the party had a plan to dislodge the government headed by Narasimha Rao "in the name of temple movement so that he could replace him".

While K C Sudarshan said this, again after two days, RSS, the mother organization of Bharatiya Janata Party, on Tuesday owned the Ayodhya movement but refused to apologise about what happened in Ayodhya in 1992 which led to demolition of the Babri mosque. Ram Madhav, an RSS leader and former spokesperson of the Sangh, said on a private channel, "We fully own up the movement. We mobilized people. People should respect the sentiment of crores of people. We are not going to apologise. Our agitation echoed the sentiment of the people at the time. It was a spontaneous act of anger by people".

=== VHP ===
The VHP said the demolition of Babri mosque was the proudest moment for Hindus and asserted it was committed to building a Ram temple at the disputed site in Ayodhya.

"Reports like that of the Liberhan Commission come and go. But, the Hindu culture, which takes pride in its heritage and protects its places of worship, has been in place for ages and will remain so for ever," VHP leader Praveen Togadia said. "Any symbolic structure left by an invader in Akhand Bharat is a national shame. And the demolition of Babri mosque was the proudest moment for Hindus," he said in a statement.Togadia asserted the VHP was committed to building a great Ram temple at the disputed site in Ayodhya and was ready to make any sacrifice for achieving this."A magnificent temple will be built at the site. It is a socio-religious, cultural and legal right of the Hindus," the VHP secretary general said.

The VHP pointed out that in para 158.3, the commission says it (Ayodhya debate) "...never became a movement..." whereas in para 158.9 & 159.10, it contradicted itself with the contention as to "entire process of the movement" and "...leaders of the movement".

The VHP says the commission failed to make any adverse comment on certain individuals despite observing in para 26.2 on page 88 that "... It is noteworthy that no member of the Muslim community from Ayodhya was a member of the Babri Masjid Action Committee or other committee protesting the opening of locks at the disputed structure. Sultan Shahabuddin Owaisi, a Member of Parliament from Hyderabad, challenged the opening of locks along with some others became a forerunner for taking on the Hindu organisation".

The VHP said that after more than 40 extensions "during seventeen long years and wasting taxpayers' money the commission had prepared a useless report." The commission declared many prominent personalities as culpable without giving them a chance of hearing. "It is shameful that in its long list of culprits one had already been died before the date of incident and seventeen thereafter before the submission of its report. The adverse comments made towards the apex court of the country, media, head of the State (Governor) and other respectable segments of the society are highly unacceptable," it said.
