= GIAN =

GIAN may stand for:

- Give it a Name, an annual British rock music festival 2005–2010
- Geneva International Academic Network, an international research network

== See also ==
- Gian, a masculine Italian given name
