= Gian Singh =

Gian Singh may refer to:

- Gian Singh (artist) (1883–1953), Indian artist
- Gian Singh (soldier) (1920–1996), British Indian Army soldier
- Gian Singh (field hockey) (1928–2004), Indian-Malaysian sportsperson
- Gian Singh (wrestler) (born 1959), Indian sportsperson

== See also ==
- Gyan Singh (disambiguation)
- Gian, a name
- Singh, an Indian surname
- Gian Singh Rab (19th century), Indian Sikh scholar
- Gian Singh Rarewala (1901–1979), Indian politician
- Giani Gian Singh (1822–1921), Indian scholar and historian
