= Anupam Gupta =

Indian senior standing lawyer

Senior Standing Council

Personal details
- Born: 1 February 1956 (age 70) Bathinda, Punjab

Anupam Gupta is a senior lawyer in the Punjab and Haryana High Court, Chandigarh, India. Most notably, he has been the lawyer of the Liberhan Commission on the destruction of the Babri Masjid on 6 December 1992.

== Education ==
Anupam Gupta did his matriculation from Government Senior Model School, Sector 16, Chandigarh.
