= Yianni =

Yianni may refer to:

- Yianni Papoutsis, Greek-English entrepreneur
- Yianni Perkatis, Australian footballer
- Yianni "Johnny" Bacolas, American musician and artist

== See also ==
- Yiannis
- Yanni (disambiguation)
