= Yan Ni =

Yan Ni is the name of:

- Yan Ni (actress) (born 1971), Chinese actress
- Yan Ni (volleyball) (born 1987), Chinese volleyball player
- Shan Sa (born 1972), born Yan Ni, Chinese-born French writer

== See also ==
- Yanni (disambiguation)
