= Gyan Singh =

Gyan Singh may refer to:

- Gyan Singh (Fijian politician)
- Gyan Singh (Indian politician) (born 1953), from Madhya Pradesh

== See also ==
- Gyan (disambiguation)
- Singh, an Indian surname
- Gian Singh (disambiguation)
- Gyan Singh Sohanpal, Indian politician
