= Yanni (disambiguation) =

Yanni is the stage name of Greek composer and musician Yiánnis Hryssomállis.

Yanni may also refer to:

== People ==
- Yanni Gourde (born 1991), Canadian ice hockey player
- Yanni Hufnagel (born 1982), American college basketball coach
- Yanni Regäsel (born 1996), German footballer
- Zhao Yanni (born 1986), Chinese long-distance steeplechase runner
- Rosanna Yanni (born 1938), stage name of Argentinian film actress Marta Susana Yanni Paxot (born 1938)
- Yanni Yuzon (born 1978), Filipino musician best known as the former guitarist of the band Pupil

== Other uses ==
- Typhoon Yanni (Heling) (1998), which killed 50 people in South Korea
- "Yanni", a song by Jean-Michel Blais from the album Aubades

== See also ==
- Yan Ni (disambiguation)
- Yannis
- Gianni
- Johnny
- Alternate forms for the name John
- Yanny or Laurel, a viral auditory illusion from May 2018
