= Netcong, New Jersey =

Borough in Morris County, New Jersey, US

- Borough
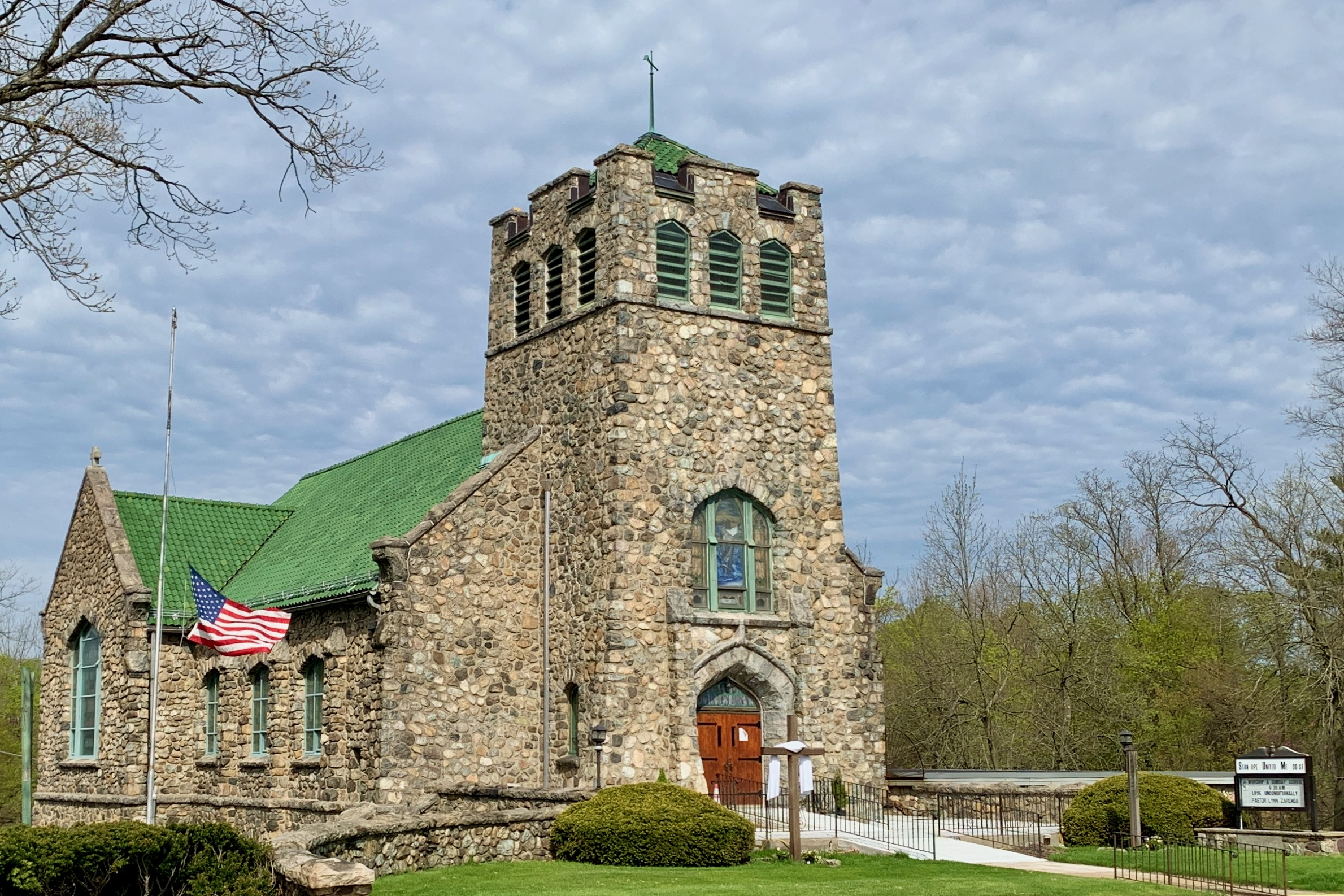
- Stanhope United Methodist Church; The Church in the Glen

- Seal
- Motto: All Roads Lead To Netcong
- Location in Morris County and the state of New Jersey.

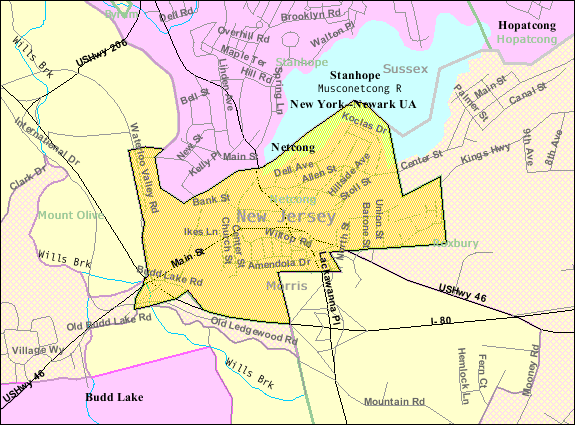
- Census Bureau map of Netcong, New Jersey

- Location in Morris County Location in New Jersey Location in the United States
- Coordinates: 40.899232°N 74.700823°W
- Country: United States
- State: New Jersey
- County: Morris
- Incorporated: October 23, 1894
- Named for: Musconetcong River

Government
  - Type: Borough
  - Body: Borough Council
  - Mayor: Elmer Still (Term ends December 31, 2027)
  - Administrator: Ralph Blakeslee
  - Municipal clerk: Cynthia L. Eckert

Area
  - Total: 0.96 sq mi (2.48 km^{2})
  - Land: 0.83 sq mi (2.15 km^{2})
  - Water: 0.12 sq mi (0.32 km^{2}) 13.33%
  - Rank: 509th of 565 in state 38th of 39 in county
- Elevation: 906 ft (276 m)

Population (2020)
  - Total: 3,375
  - Estimate (2024): 3,925
  - Rank: 432nd of 565 in state 37th of 39 in county
  - Density: 4,053.1/sq mi (1,564.9/km^{2})
  - Rank: 156th of 565 in state 4th of 39 in county
- Time zone: UTC−05:00 (Eastern (EST))
  - Summer (DST): UTC−04:00 (Eastern (EDT))
- ZIP Code: 07857
- Area code: 973
- FIPS code: 3402750130
- GNIS feature ID: 0885316
- Website: www.netcong.org

Netcong is a borough in southwestern Morris County, in the U.S. state of New Jersey. As of the 2020 United States census, the borough's population was 3,375, an increase of 143 (+4.4%) from the 2010 census count of 3,232, which in turn reflected an increase of 652 (+25.3%) from the 2,580 counted in the 2000 census. Netcong lies on the shores of Lake Musconetcong.

Established as South Stanhope by workers employed as miners in Stanhope, the name "Netcong" was adopted for the community in 1889 when a post office used the name. Netcong was incorporated as a borough by an act of the New Jersey Legislature on October 23, 1894, from portions of both Mount Olive Township and Roxbury Township, based on the results of a referendum held the previous day.

== History ==
Netcong received its name from the Musconetcong River, named by the Lenape Native Americans and meaning "grass creek", "swamp stream", "rapid stream" or "clear stream place". Along with the river, the proximity of the old Morris and Sussex Turnpike, which passed through the region shortly after 1801, and the coming of the Morris Canal, in 1831, made the site a favorable one for development.

After becoming a borough, the residents had to elect the first governing body. The first mayor was Abraham J. Drake, elected November 14, 1894. A census of Netcong taken July 1895 showed a population of 877 people.

Netcong derived much of its business from the Delaware, Lackawanna and Western Railroad, which had its last stop in Morris County in the heart of the borough. The DL&W's Sussex Branch to Branchville also stopped at Netcong Station, with the Sussex Branch coming into the opposite side of the station from where NJ Transit's line is today. The big railroad roundhouse in Port Morris also supplied many jobs for the town residents.

In 1968, AT&T announced that the company would be building a two-story building in the borough at the bottom of a hole 47 feet (14 m) underground. The facility, designed to connect a cable running between Boston and Miami, was designed to withstand a nuclear attack and continue 24-hour operations for as long as three weeks using supplies and generating capacity on the site.

== Geography ==
According to the United States Census Bureau, the borough had a total area of 0.96 square miles (2.49 km^{2}), including 0.83 square miles (2.16 km^{2}) of land and 0.13 square miles (0.33 km^{2}) of water (13.33%).

Netcong borders the municipalities of Mount Olive Township and Roxbury Township in Morris County; and Stanhope in Sussex County.

== Demographics ==
Historical population
Census	Pop.	Note	%±
1900	941		—
1910	1,532		62.8%
1920	1,800		17.5%
1930	2,097		16.5%
1940	2,157		2.9%
1950	2,284		5.9%
1960	2,765		21.1%
1970	2,858		3.4%
1980	3,557		24.5%
1990	3,311		−6.9%
2000	2,580		−22.1%
2010	3,232		25.3%
2020	3,375		4.4%
2024 (est.)	3,925	▲	16.3%
Population sources: 1900–1920; 1900–1910 1910–1930; 1940–2000 2000; 2010 2020

=== 2020 census ===
As of the 2020 census, Netcong had a population of 3,375. The median age was 41.1 years. 18.9% of residents were under the age of 18 and 17.0% of residents were 65 years of age or older. For every 100 females there were 96.6 males, and for every 100 females age 18 and over there were 92.9 males age 18 and over.

100.0% of residents lived in urban areas, while 0.0% lived in rural areas.

There were 1,434 households in Netcong, of which 25.5% had children under the age of 18 living in them. Of all households, 40.9% were married-couple households, 20.7% were households with a male householder and no spouse or partner present, and 30.8% were households with a female householder and no spouse or partner present. About 33.2% of all households were made up of individuals and 13.4% had someone living alone who was 65 years of age or older.

There were 1,490 housing units, of which 3.8% were vacant. The homeowner vacancy rate was 2.4% and the rental vacancy rate was 3.3%.

Racial composition as of the 2020 census
Race	Number	Percent
White	2,321	68.8%
Black or African American	158	4.7%
American Indian and Alaska Native	21	0.6%
Asian	118	3.5%
Native Hawaiian and Other Pacific Islander	0	0.0%
Some other race	418	12.4%
Two or more races	339	10.0%
Hispanic or Latino (of any race)	817	24.2%

=== 2010 census ===
The 2010 United States census counted 3,232 people, 1,381 households, and 811 families in the borough. The population density was 3,828.4 per square mile (1,478.2/km^{2}). There were 1,449 housing units at an average density of 1,716.4 per square mile (662.7/km^{2}). The racial makeup was 84.22% (2,722) White, 3.90% (126) Black or African American, 0.34% (11) Native American, 2.78% (90) Asian, 0.00% (0) Pacific Islander, 6.71% (217) from other races, and 2.04% (66) from two or more races. Hispanic or Latino of any race were 17.70% (572) of the population.

Of the 1,381 households, 23.5% had children under the age of 18; 41.7% were married couples living together; 11.9% had a female householder with no husband present and 41.3% were non-families. Of all households, 32.7% were made up of individuals and 9.4% had someone living alone who was 65 years of age or older. The average household size was 2.34 and the average family size was 2.99.

18.8% of the population were under the age of 18, 8.8% from 18 to 24, 29.9% from 25 to 44, 29.0% from 45 to 64, and 13.6% who were 65 years of age or older. The median age was 40.1 years. For every 100 females, the population had 97.1 males. For every 100 females ages 18 and older there were 95.5 males.

The Census Bureau's 2006–2010 American Community Survey showed that (in 2010 inflation-adjusted dollars) median household income was $59,167 (with a margin of error of +/− $9,354) and the median family income was $72,222 (+/− $9,501). Males had a median income of $64,569 (+/− $6,401) versus $46,094 (+/− $3,857) for females. The per capita income for the borough was $32,135 (+/− $3,825). About 7.8% of families and 7.7% of the population were below the poverty line, including 7.3% of those under age 18 and 4.6% of those age 65 or over.

=== 2000 census ===
As of the 2000 United States census there were 2,580 people, 1,008 households, and 681 families residing in the town. The population density was 3,066.8 inhabitants per square mile (1,184.1/km^{2}). There were 1,043 housing units at an average density of 1,239.8 per square mile (478.7/km^{2}). The racial makeup of the borough was 94.30% White, 1.20% African American, 0.04% Native American, 1.67% Asian, 1.43% from other races, and 1.36% from two or more races. Hispanic or Latino of any race were 7.13% of the population.

The most common ancestries in Netcong is Italian (23.5%), Irish (11.4%), German (10.4%), English (6.6%), and Hungarian (3.3%)

There were 1,008 households, out of which 30.5% had children under the age of 18 living with them, 50.3% were married couples living together, 11.8% had a female householder with no husband present, and 32.4% were non-families. 26.3% of all households were made up of individuals, and 9.6% had someone living alone who was 65 years of age or older. The average household size was 2.56 and the average family size was 3.10.

In the borough the population was spread out, with 23.0% under the age of 18, 7.2% from 18 to 24, 32.7% from 25 to 44, 22.5% from 45 to 64, and 14.6% who were 65 years of age or older. The median age was 38 years. For every 100 females, there were 96.5 males. For every 100 females age 18 and over, there were 92.5 males.

The median income for a household in the borough was $55,000, and the median income for a family was $65,833. Males had a median income of $42,179 versus $36,458 for females. The per capita income for the borough was $23,472. About 2.5% of families and 3.1% of the population were below the poverty line, including 1.2% of those under age 18 and 5.4% of those age 65 or over.

== Government ==
=== Local government ===
Netcong is governed under the borough form of New Jersey municipal government, which is used in 218 municipalities (of the 564) statewide, making it the most common form of government in New Jersey. The governing body is comprised of the mayor and the borough council, with all positions elected at-large on a partisan basis as part of the November general election. The mayor is elected directly by the voters to a four-year term of office. The borough council includes six members elected to serve three-year terms on a staggered basis, with two seats coming up for election each year in a three-year cycle. The borough form of government used by Netcong is a "weak mayor / strong council" government in which council members act as the legislative body with the mayor presiding at meetings and voting only in the event of a tie. The mayor can veto ordinances subject to an override by a two-thirds majority vote of the council. The mayor makes committee and liaison assignments for council members, and most appointments are made by the mayor with the advice and consent of the council.

As of 2023, the mayor of Netcong is Republican Joseph A. Nametko, whose term of office ends December 31, 2023. Members of the Borough Council are Joseph W. Albensi III (R, 2024), Robert E. Hathaway Jr. (D, 2025), Thomas A. Laureys (R, 2025), Todd Morton (R, 2024), Elmer M. Still (R, 2023) and John "Jack" Sylvester Jr. (R, 2023).

=== Federal, state and county representation ===
Netcong is located in the 7th Congressional District and is part of New Jersey's 24th state legislative district.

For the 119th United States Congress, New Jersey's 7th congressional district is represented by Thomas Kean Jr. (R, Westfield). New Jersey is represented in the United States Senate by Democrats Cory Booker (Newark, term ends 2027) and Andy Kim (Moorestown, term ends 2031).

For the 2026–2027 session, the 24th legislative district of the New Jersey Legislature is represented in the State Senate by Parker Space (R, Wantage Township) and in the General Assembly by Dawn Fantasia (R, Franklin) and Mike Inganamort (R, Chester Township).

Morris County is governed by a Board of County Commissioners comprised of seven members who are elected at-large in partisan elections to three-year terms on a staggered basis, with either one or three seats up for election each year as part of the November general election. Actual day-to-day operation of departments is supervised by County Administrator Deena Leary.

As of 2026, Morris County's Commissioners (with all terms ending December 31) are Director Stephen H. Shaw (R, Mountain Lakes, 2027), Deputy Director John Krickus (R, Washington Township, 2027), Douglas Cabana (R, Boonton Township, 2028), Thomas J. Mastrangelo (R, Montville, 2028), Christine Myers (R, Harding Township, 2028), Tayfun Selen (R, Chatham Township, 2026), and Deborah Smith (R, Denville Township, 2027).

The county's constitutional officers are County Clerk Ann F. Grossi (R, Parsippany–Troy Hills, 2028), Sheriff James M. Gannon (R, Boonton Township, 2025) and Surrogate Heather Darling (R, Roxbury, 2029).

=== Politics ===
United States presidential election results for Netcong 2024 2020 2016 2012 2008 2004
Year	Republican		Democratic		Third party(ies)	
Year	No.	%	No.	%	No.	%
2024	995	59.23%	655	38.99%	30	1.79%
2020	927	55.88%	706	42.56%	26	1.57%
2016	846	59.83%	513	36.28%	55	3.89%
2012	649	55.09%	514	43.63%	15	1.27%
2008	751	56.68%	561	42.34%	13	0.98%
2004	778	62.54%	456	36.66%	10	0.80%

As of March 2011, there were a total of 1,754 registered voters in Netcong, of which 385 (21.9%) were registered as Democrats, 654 (37.3%) were registered as Republicans and 715 (40.8%) were registered as Unaffiliated. There were no voters registered to other parties.

In the 2012 presidential election, Republican Mitt Romney received 55.1% of the vote (649 cast), ahead of Democrat Barack Obama with 43.6% (514 votes), and other candidates with 1.3% (15 votes), among the 1,185 ballots cast by the borough's 1,870 registered voters (7 ballots were spoiled), for a turnout of 63.4%. In the 2008 presidential election, Republican John McCain received 56.3% of the vote (751 cast), ahead of Democrat Barack Obama with 42.1% (561 votes) and other candidates with 1.0% (13 votes), among the 1,334 ballots cast by the borough's 1,822 registered voters, for a turnout of 73.2%. In the 2004 presidential election, Republican George W. Bush received 62.3% of the vote (778 ballots cast), outpolling Democrat John Kerry with 36.5% (456 votes) and other candidates with 0.6% (10 votes), among the 1,249 ballots cast by the borough's 1,784 registered voters, for a turnout percentage of 70.0.

Gubernatorial election results for Netcong
Year	Republican		Democratic		Third party(ies)	
Year	No.	%	No.	%	No.	%
2025	709	54.45%	581	44.62%	12	0.92%
2021	624	64.07%	335	34.39%	15	1.54%
2017	486	60.83%	294	36.80%	19	2.38%
2013	550	73.63%	175	23.43%	22	2.95%
2009	543	59.54%	279	30.59%	90	9.87%
2005	433	56.31%	315	40.96%	21	2.73%

In the 2013 gubernatorial election, Republican Chris Christie received 73.6% of the vote (550 cast), ahead of Democrat Barbara Buono with 23.4% (175 votes), and other candidates with 2.9% (22 votes), among the 770 ballots cast by the borough's 1,834 registered voters (23 ballots were spoiled), for a turnout of 42.0%. In the 2009 gubernatorial election, Republican Chris Christie received 59.0% of the vote (543 ballots cast), ahead of Democrat Jon Corzine with 30.3% (279 votes), Independent Chris Daggett with 8.9% (82 votes) and other candidates with 0.9% (8 votes), among the 921 ballots cast by the borough's 1,787 registered voters, yielding a 51.5% turnout.

United States Senate election results for Netcong1
Year	Republican		Democratic		Third party(ies)	
Year	No.	%	No.	%	No.	%
2024	820	55.11%	619	41.60%	49	3.29%
2018	659	57.81%	426	37.37%	55	4.82%
2012	556	54.46%	446	43.68%	19	1.86%
2006	481	57.88%	334	40.19%	16	1.93%

United States Senate election results for Netcong2
Year	Republican		Democratic		Third party(ies)	
Year	No.	%	No.	%	No.	%
2020	844	53.05%	722	45.38%	25	1.57%
2014	352	61.32%	210	36.59%	12	2.09%
2013	319	63.80%	175	35.00%	6	1.20%
2008	598	53.87%	490	44.14%	22	1.98%

== Education ==
Netcong is home to the Netcong School District, which serves public school students in pre-kindergarten through eighth grade at Netcong Elementary School. As of the 2022–23 school year, the district, comprised of one school, had an enrollment of 299 students and 32.0 classroom teachers (on an FTE basis), for a student–teacher ratio of 9.3:1.

For ninth through twelfth grades, public school students attend Lenape Valley Regional High School, which serves students from Netcong and from the Sussex County communities of Byram Township and Stanhope. As of the 2022–23 school year, the high school had an enrollment of 667 students and 58.3 classroom teachers (on an FTE basis), for a student–teacher ratio of 11.5:1. Seats on the high school district's nine-member board of education are allocated based on the populations of the constituent municipalities, with two seats assigned to Netcong. Netcong residents previously attended Netcong High School. The school closed in 1974 and the building became Netcong Elementary School.

St. Michael School is a Catholic school operated under the auspices of the Roman Catholic Diocese of Paterson, that was founded in 1923, and staffed by the Sisters of Christian Charity of Mendham starting in 1945. The school closed at the end of the school year in June 2016 and was merged with four other elementary schools and relocated to the campus at Pope John XXIII Regional High School in Sparta, New Jersey.

== Patron saint ==
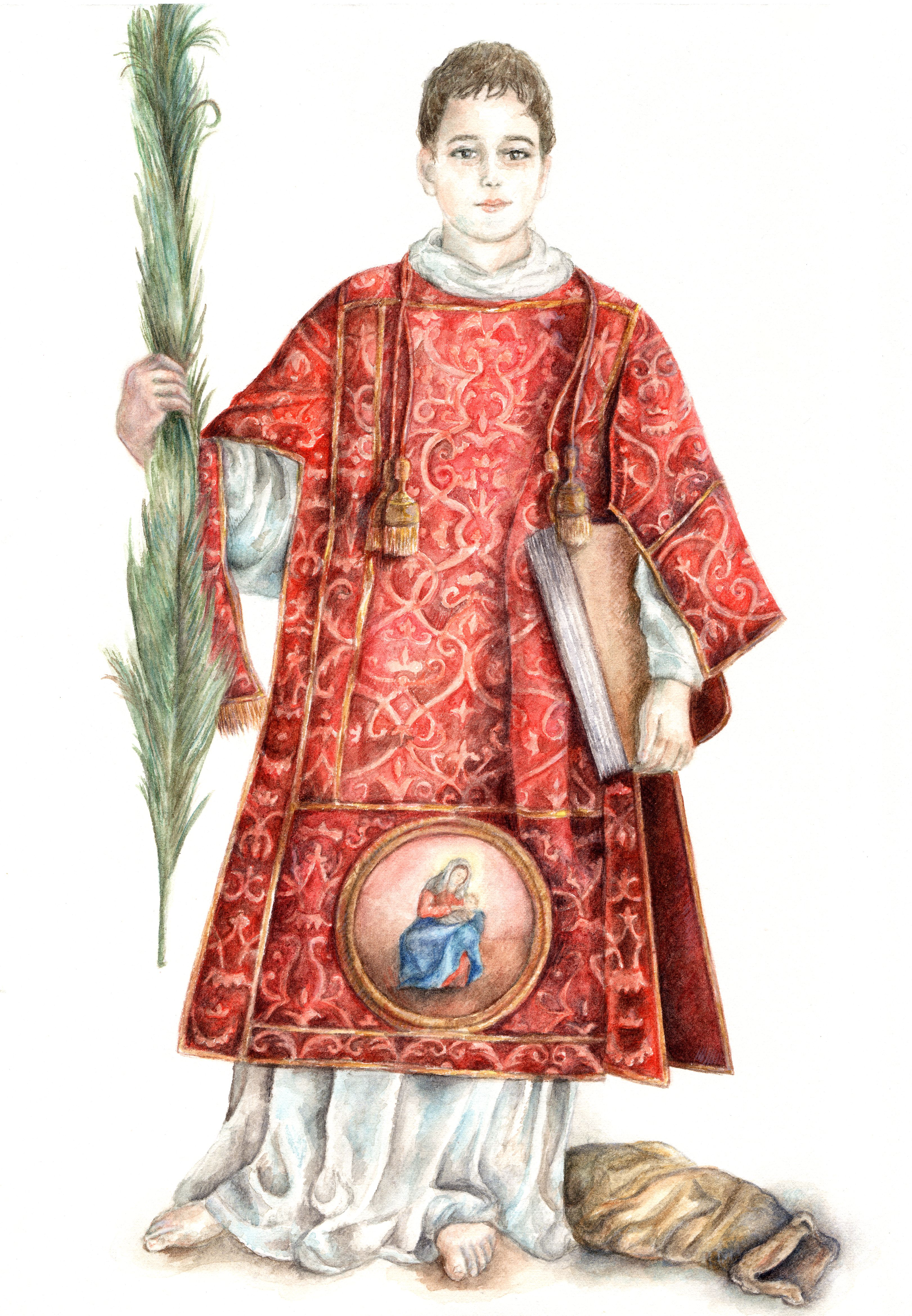
St. Cesario deacon and martyr, Patron of Netcong.

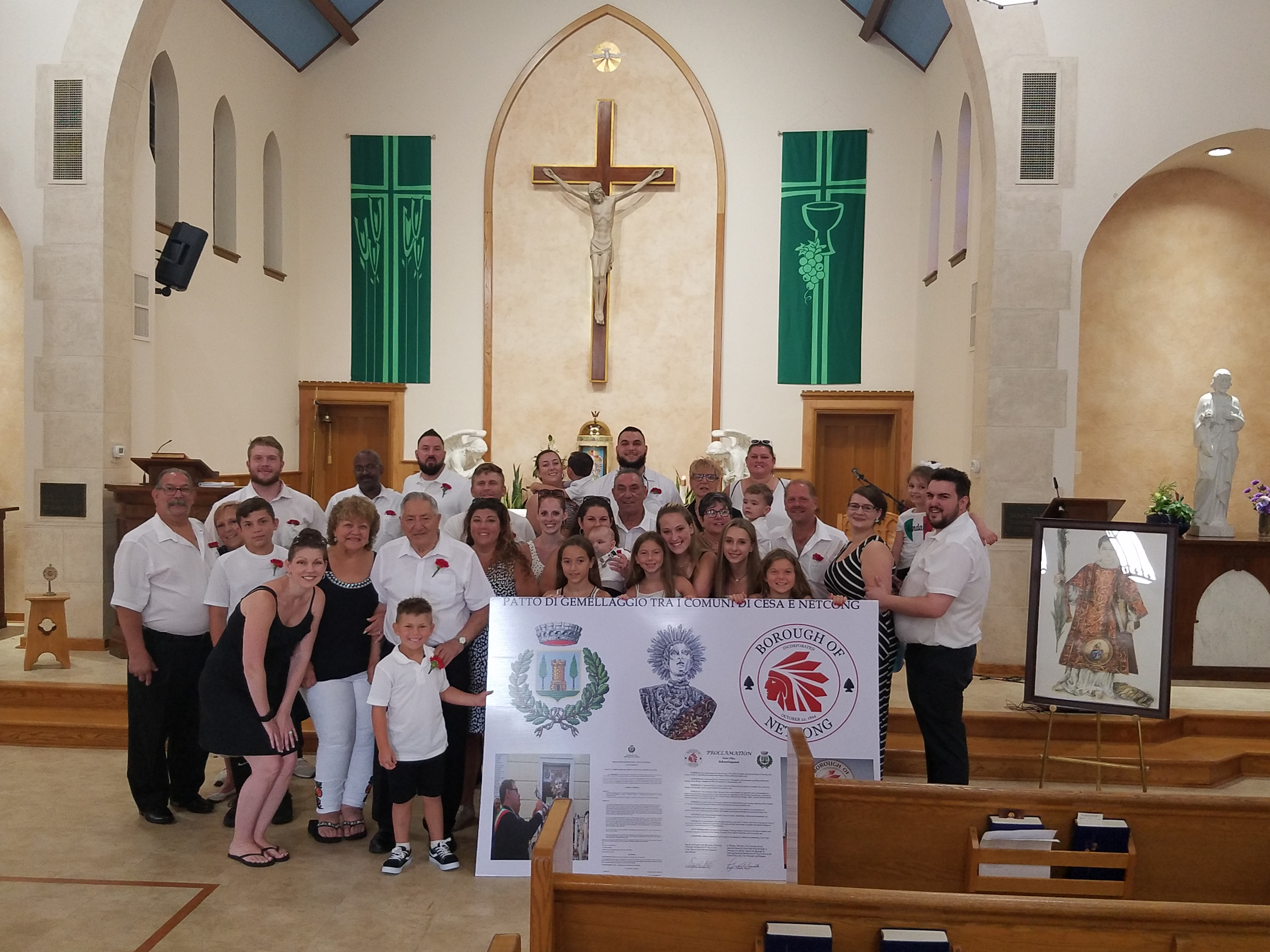
Netcong, St. Michael's Church, Pact of Sister Cities with Cesa in honor of St. Cesario martyr, July 20, 2019

The patron saint of the borough is St. Cesario deacon and martyr of Terracina. In 1893 some Italian immigrants left their hometown of Cesa, a province of Caserta (Italy), to come to the United States. They settled in Netcong, attracted by job opportunities at the Singer Steel Foundry, and in the construction of the railroad which was replacing the Morris Canal as a means of transportation. They established the "St. Cesario Society" in 1902 in honor of their hometown's patron saint, Cesario deacon and martyr. Saint Cesario is venerated in St. Michael Church of Netcong; a bone fragment with the Latin cartouche "ex ossibus S. Caesarii diac. m." (donated in 1963 by Cardinal Clemente Micara, Vicar General of the Diocese of Rome) is preserved in this church, set in a silver reliquary, solemnly exposed on the high altar for the feast, celebrated on the penultimate Saturday of July. In Saint Michael's Church also includes a wooden statue of St. Cesario, a stained glass window and an icon (in the Sacristy) depicting the martyr.

On June 6, 2019, the mayor of Netcong, Joe Nametko, signed the Pact of Sister Cities with Cesa, in honor of St. Cesario.

== Transportation ==
=== Roads and highways ===
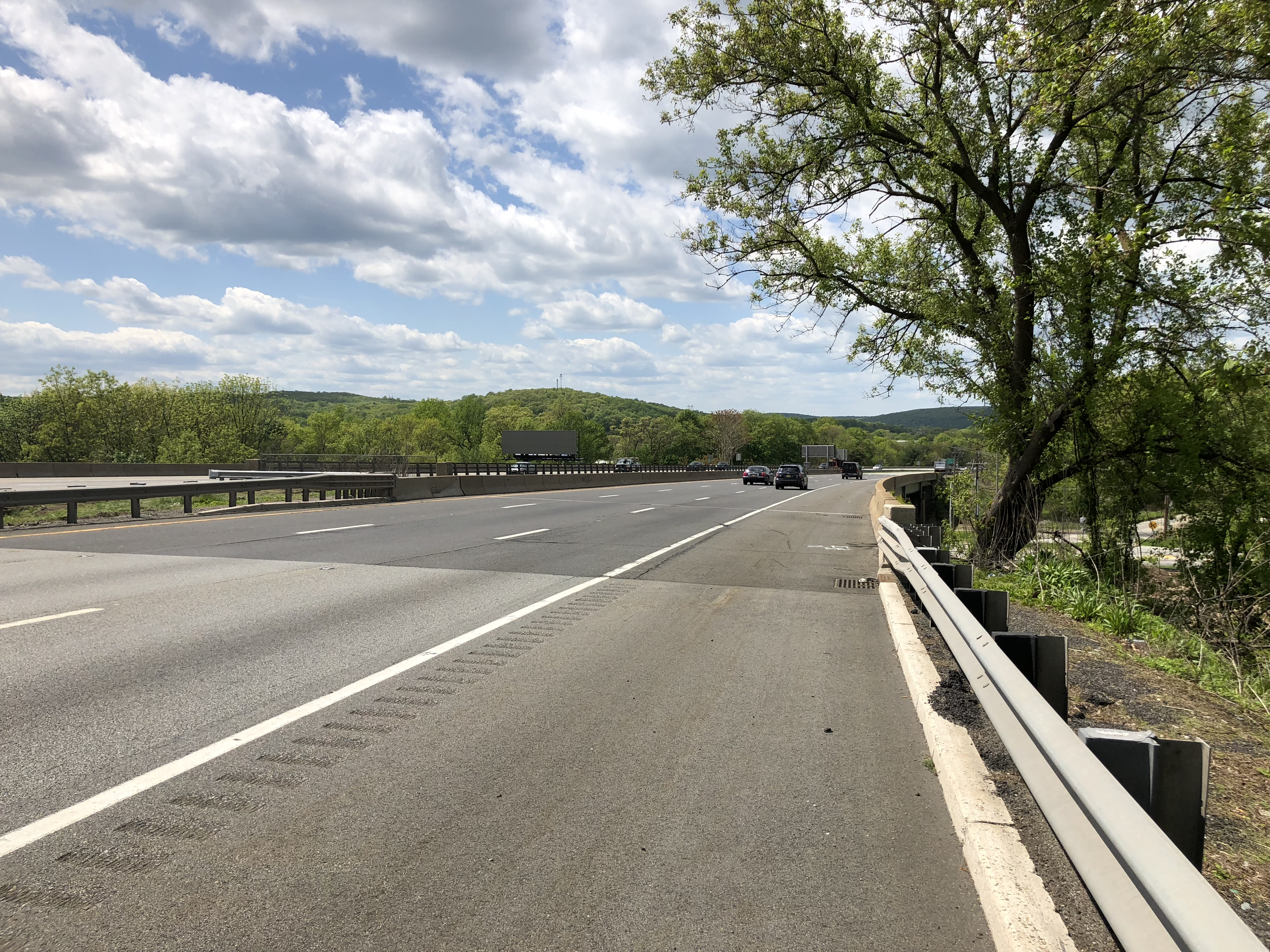
Interstate 80 and U.S. Route 206 in Netcong

As of May 2010, the borough had a total of 10.36 miles (16.67 km) of roadways, of which 7.90 miles (12.71 km) were maintained by the municipality, 0.67 miles (1.08 km) by Morris County and 1.79 miles (2.88 km) by the New Jersey Department of Transportation.

Several major highways pass through Netcong, leading to the borough's motto of "All Roads Lead to Netcong". Major roadways in Netcong include Interstate 80 (the Bergen-Passaic Expressway), U.S. Route 46 and Route 183, the latter two highways meeting at the Netcong Circle. The New Jersey Department of Transportation (NJDOT) uses Netcong as a control city on directional signage on its highways throughout northern New Jersey, and as far away as the George Washington Bridge, even though less than one-tenth of a mile of Interstate 80 is in the borough (from mile markers 26.33 to 26.42). Interstate 80 and U.S. Route 206 intersect with U.S. Route 46 in the southwest corner of the borough at Exit 26.

In 2007, the New Jersey Department of Transportation proposed the elimination of the Netcong Traffic Circle, located at the intersections of U.S. Route 46 and Route 183 just north of the interchange with Interstate 80, and its replacement with a signalized intersection. The circle itself dated back to construction in 1938 and was unable to handle the 17,000 vehicles a year that used the large roadway daily. The circle was the frequent site of vehicular accidents, including a total of 81 in 2007 and 2008. The project had issues dealing with the vertical clearance of the overpass for U.S. Route 46 westbound. The removal of the circle would eliminate this bridge, and the land would go to use as the new signalized intersection, with pedestrian and bicycle fittings. The entire project cost about $13.3 million of state and local funds to construct. A temporary interchange was implemented in January 2013, with the permanent intersection configuration completed that August.

=== Public transportation ===
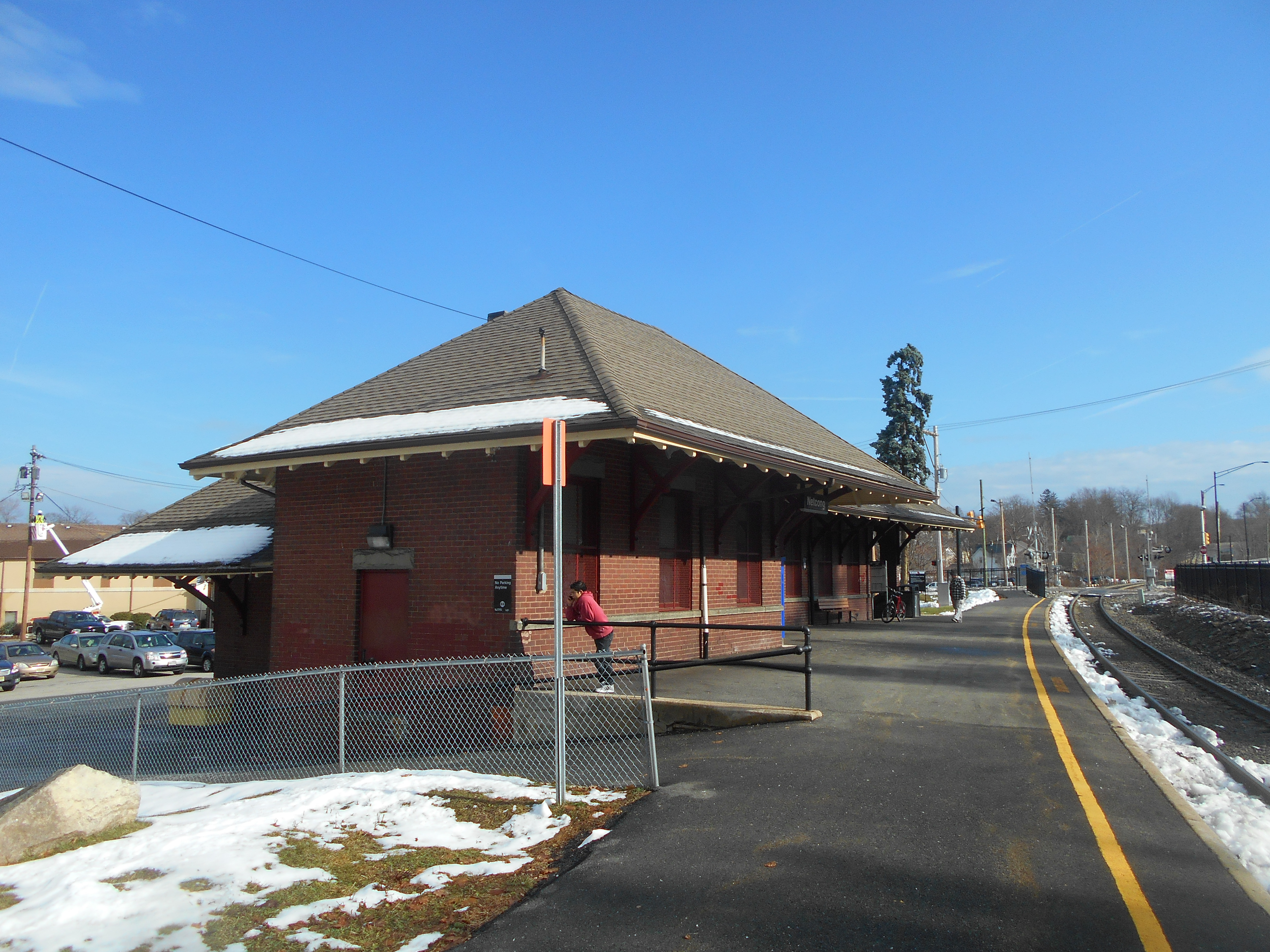
Netcong Train Station

NJ Transit operates weekday rail service at the Netcong station to Hoboken Terminal, with service to Penn Station in New York City via Midtown Direct on the Montclair-Boonton Line and the Morris & Essex Lines.

NJ Transit used to provide local service on the MCM5 route. The Morris County Department of Transportation provides bus service along Route 46 to Dover and Mount Olive Township.

Lakeland Bus Lines provides service along Route 80 between Newton and the Port Authority Bus Terminal in Midtown Manhattan.

In view of Netcong's rich railroad history, the borough has been named as a site for the New Jersey State Railroad and Transportation Museum (jointly with Phillipsburg). Given that the site envisioned for this museum in Phillipsburg has been sold for development as a townhouse complex and college campus annex, it is unclear what role Phillipsburg will play in this museum. Funding will need to be secured in order to build and operate this museum.

== Notable people ==
People who were born in, residents of, or otherwise closely associated with Netcong include:

- John Giannantonio (born 1934), former football player whose 594.5 rushing yards per game average, 4,756 season rushing yards total, and single-game rushing 754 yards against Mountain Lakes High School, all set in 1950 as a sophomore at Netcong High School, remain national high school records as of 2016
- Hugh Meade (1907–1949), congressman who represented Maryland's 2nd congressional district from 1947 to 1949
- Reince Priebus (born 1972), chairman of the Republican National Committee
