= Netcong School District =

School district in Morris County, New Jersey, US

Address
- 26 College Road Netcong, Morris County, New Jersey, 07857; United States
- Coordinates: 40.899821°N 74.699237°W

District information
- Grades: PreK to 8
- Superintendent: Kathleen E. Walsh
- Business administrator: Paul Stabile
- Schools: 1

Students and staff
- Enrollment: 299 (as of 2022–23)
- Faculty: 32.0 FTEs
- Student–teacher ratio: 9.3:1

Other information
- District Factor Group: DE
- Website: www.netcongschool.org
Ind.	Per pupil	District spending	Rank (*)	K-8 average	%± vs. average
1A	Total Spending	$16,141	9	$18,891	−14.6%
1	Budgetary Cost	12,511	13	14,159	−11.6%
2	Classroom Instruction	8,154	21	8,659	−5.8%
6	Support Services	1,293	3	2,167	−40.3%
8	Administrative Cost	1,701	41	1,547	10.0%
10	Operations & Maintenance	1,238	11	1,612	−23.2%
13	Extracurricular Activities	125	29	104	20.2%
16	Median Teacher Salary	62,000	55	61,136
Data from NJDoE 2014 Taxpayers' Guide to Education Spending. *Of K-8 districts with up to 400 students. Lowest spending=1; Highest=71

The Netcong School District is a community public school district that serves students in pre-kindergarten through eighth grade from Netcong, in Morris County, in the U.S. state of New Jersey.

As of the 2022–23 school year, the district, comprised of one school, had an enrollment of 299 students and 32.0 classroom teachers (on an FTE basis), for a student–teacher ratio of 9.3:1.

The district is classified by the New Jersey Department of Education as being in District Factor Group "DE", the fifth-highest of eight groupings. District Factor Groups organize districts statewide to allow comparison by common socioeconomic characteristics of the local districts. From lowest socioeconomic status to highest, the categories are A, B, CD, DE, FG, GH, I and J.

For ninth through twelfth grades, public school students attend Lenape Valley Regional High School, which serves Netcong and the Sussex County communities of Stanhope and Byram Township. As of the 2022–23 school year, the high school had an enrollment of 667 students and 58.3 classroom teachers (on an FTE basis), for a student–teacher ratio of 11.5:1.

== History ==
The district formerly operated Netcong High School. The school, which opened in the 1900s, closed in 1974; the building became Netcong Elementary School.

Judge Joseph Stamler of New Jersey Superior Court issued a decision in February 1970 in the case State Board of Education v. Board of Education of Netcong, New Jersey regarding a matter in which the district's school board had a policy providing for voluntary daily school readings at the start of the school day at the high school of prayers that had been published in the Congressional Record, as delivered by Chaplain of the United States House of Representatives. Attendance at these readings was voluntary, and the board said that they were intended as inspirational remarks, rather than prayer in the schools. In his decision, Judge Stamler prohibited what he described as a "subterfuge [that] is degrading to all religions", arguing that by taking what were "beautiful prayers" and referring to them merely as "remarks", the school district was working to "peddle religion in a very cheap manner under an assumed name." The New Jersey Supreme Court unanimously affirmed Stamler's decision and the United States Supreme Court refused to hear an appeal from the district's school board.

== School ==
Netcong Elementary School had an enrollment of 295 students in grades PreK-8 as of the 2022–23 school year.

- Kurt Ceresnak, principal

== Administration ==
Core members of the district's administration are:

- Kathleen Walsh, superintendent
- Paul Stabile, business administrator and board secretary

== Board of education ==
The district's board of education, comprised of nine members, sets policy and oversees the fiscal and educational operation of the district through its administration. As a Type II school district, the board's trustees are elected directly by voters to serve three-year terms of office on a staggered basis, with three seats up for election each year held (since 2012) as part of the November general election. The board appoints a superintendent to oversee the district's day-to-day operations and a business administrator to supervise the business functions of the district.
