= Giovanni Antonio Lecchi =

Italian Jesuit and mathematician

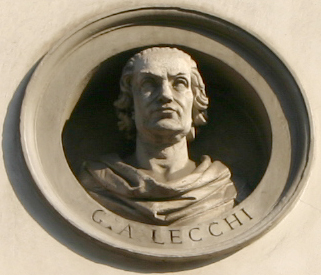
- Portrait of Giovanni Antonio Lecchi
- Born: 17 November 1702; Milan, Duchy of Milan
- Died: 24 May 1776 (aged 73); Milan, Duchy of Milan
- Education: Jesuit College of Brera, Milan
- Occupations: Mathematician; Engineer; Physicist
- Parent(s): Giacomo Antonio Lecchi and Elena Lecchi (née Crivelli)
- Scientific career
- Fields: Mathematics; Geometry; Natural philosophy; Hydrostatic; Hydrodinamics
- Workplaces: Jesuit College of Brera, Milan

Giovanni Antonio Lecchi or Giannantonio Lecchi (Milan, 17 November 1702 – 24 July 1776) was an Italian Jesuit, mathematician, engineer and physicist. He lived and worked with success in Milan rising to a notable level of prominence.

== Life ==
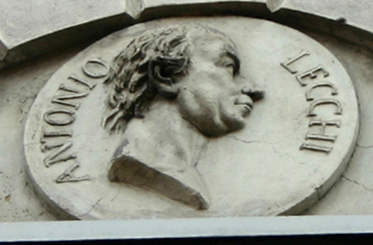
A 19th century medallion of Giovanni Antonio Lecchi on the facade of Palazzo Beccaria in via Brera street, Milan (birthplace of Cesare Beccaria)

Giovanni Antonio Lecchi was born in 1702 into a prominent noble family of Milan. His family owned Villa Lecchi in Crescenzago. After completing his studies at the Jesuit College of Brera in Milan, he joined the Society of Jesus in 1718, and professed his fourth vow on 15 August 1736.

At first professor of humanities in Pavia and Vercelli, Lecchi taught mathematics and hydraulics at the Brera College in Milan from 1738 to 1773. He also worked as technical consultant for the Senate of Milan on hydraulic matters. His first work was published in Milan in 1739 and it was about the theory of light ("Theoria lucis, opticam, perspectivam, catoptricam, dioptricam complectens"). In his second work he dealt with mathematical analysis according to the basic elements of Newton's method, and provided also a full course of geometry, algebra and trigonometry. In his first hydraulic papers, written on behalf of the College of Brera, Lecchi tried to apply mathematics to the problem of the measure of the speed and of the flow rate of water, by using a theoretical approach.

From 1757 years Lecchi worked mainly as a hydraulic engineer. In 1759, the Austrian Empress, Maria Theresa conferred upon him the title of imperial mathematician and hydraulic engineer, for which he received an annual pension of 300 florins. Later, Pope Clement XIII appointed him the director of hydraulic works of the papal territories. In the years 1765-67 Lecchi made some inspections in the Reno valleys together with two other engineers, Tommaso Temanza and Giovanni Verace. The results of Lecchi’s surveys were published in the Memorie idrostatico-storiche delle operazioni eseguite nell’inalveazione del Reno di Bologna (Modena, 1773). In his Idrostatica (Hydrostatics, 1765), Lecchi provided a good theoretical grounding in the science of waters. Lecchi renounced the appointment with the advent of Pope Clement XIV.

Lecchi was a friend and correspondent of Roger Joseph Boscovich. On his request, Boscovich revised the Idrostatica and contributed to Lecchi's work, writing a theoretical essay on the principles of hydrostatics that was inserted into the third part of the work. After the suppression of the Society of Jesus Lecchi withdrew from public life. He died in Milan on 24 May 1776.

== Works ==
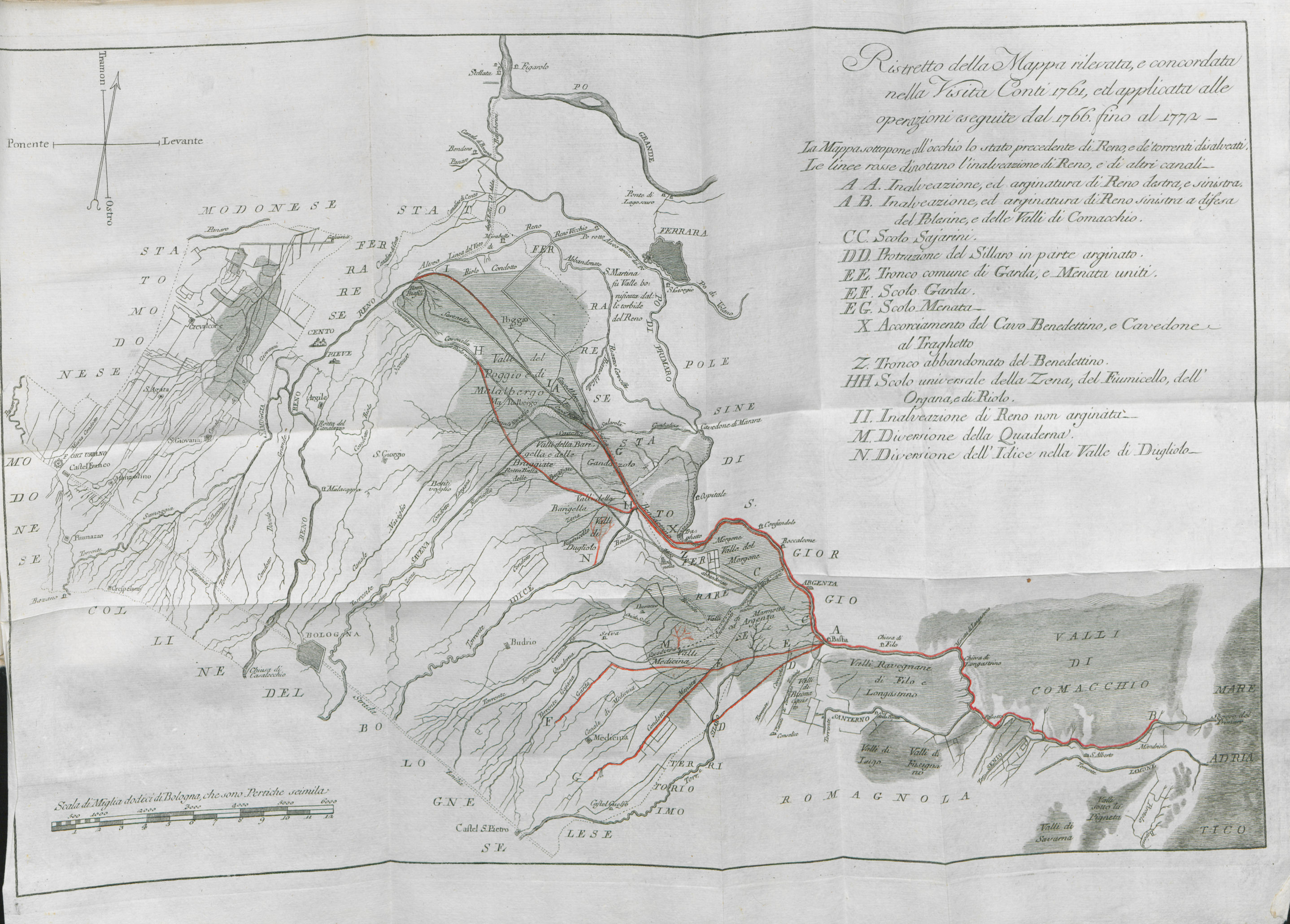
Map from Memorie idrostatico-storiche delle operazioni eseguite nell'inalveazione del Reno di Bologna, 1773

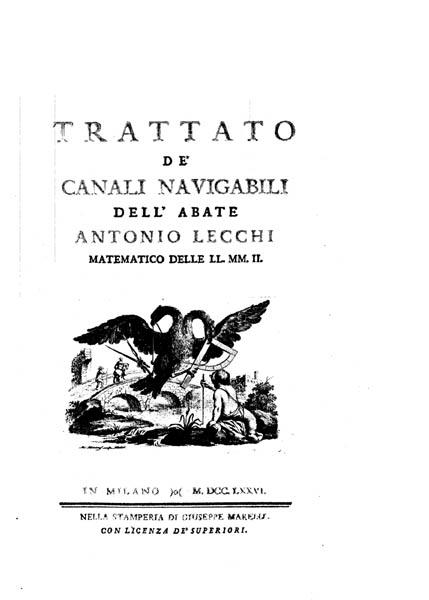
Trattato de' canali navigabili, 1776

- Theoria lucis, opticam, perspectivam, catoptricam, dioptricam complectens, Milan, 1739.
- Avvertenze contrapposte alla Storia del probabilismo scritta dal padre Daniello Concina, e indirizzate ad un erudito cavaliere, Johann Eberhard Kalin, 1744.
- Trigonometriae theorico-practicae planae et sphericae (in Latin). Mediolani: Giuseppe Marelli. 1756.
- De sectionibus conicis (in Latin). Mediolani: Giuseppe Marelli. 1758.
- Elementa geometriae theoricae, et practicae. Ad usum universitatis Braydensis, 2 vols., Milan, Giuseppe Marelli, 1753-1754.
- Lettera intorno alle arginature di Po ne' confini del Piacentino e del Milanese (in Italian). Milano: nella stamperia di Giuseppe Marelli. 1761.
- Piano della separazione, inalveazione e sfogo de' tre torrenti di Tradate, del Gardaluso e del Bozzente, Milan, 1762.
- Sentimento sullo stesso soggetto in sequela d'altra controversia sul Cremonese. Piacenza: Filippo Giuseppe Giacopazzi. 1764.
- Idrostatica esaminata ne' suoi principj e stabilita nelle sue regole della misura dell'acque corrente, Milan, G. Marelli, 1765.
- Parere di Gianantonio Lecchi ... intorno al Taglio del Tidone e della Luretta.
- Del riparo de' pennelli alle rive del Po di Cremona. [Milan].
- Riflessioni spettanti a' ripari necessarj per mantere l'imboccatura del Ticino nel canale detto il Naviglio grande di Milano. [Milan].
- Delle origini delle inondazioni del Redefosso, e del metodo di ripararle. [Milan].
- Relazione della visita alle terre danneggiate dalle acque di Bologna, Ferrara e Ravenna. In Roma: [s.n.] 1767.
- Trattato de' canali navigabili dell'abate Antonio Lecchi matematico delle LL.MM.II. In Milano: nella stamperia di Giuseppe Marelli. 1776. Repr. Giovanni Silvestri, 1824.
- Considerazioni dirette all'ill.ma ed ecc.ma Congregazione di patrimonio della eccellentissima città di Milano intorno alla terza diversione del torrente Redefosso per il nuovo cavo progettato al di sotto de' mulini della Vecchiabbia. [Milan].
- Relazione dello stato presente del canale di Muzza, e piano delle riparazioni. [Milan]. n.d.
- Memorie idrostatico-storiche. Vol. 1. In Modena: presso la Società tipografica. 1773.
- Memorie idrostatico-storiche. Vol. 2. In Modena: presso la Società tipografica. 1773.
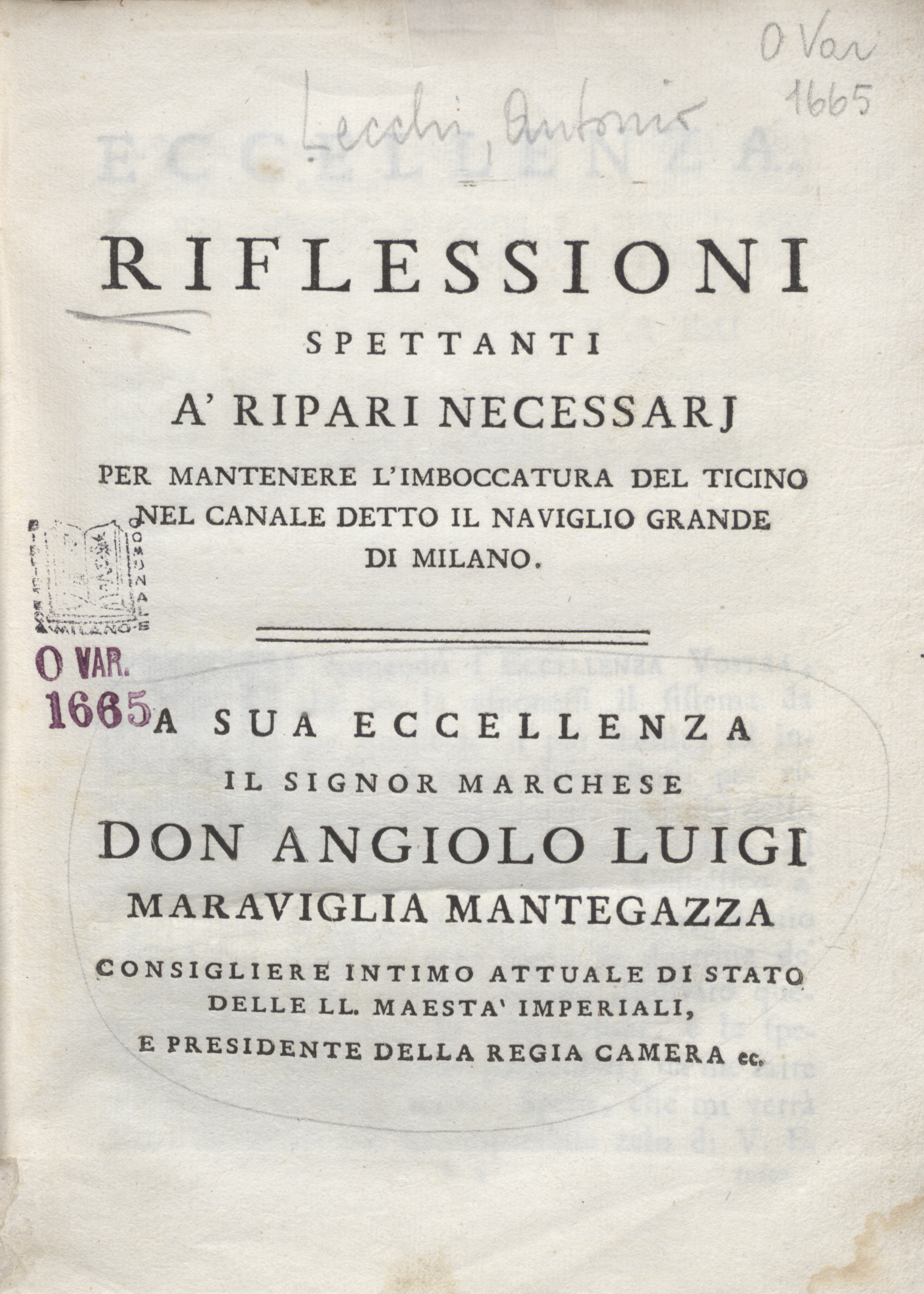
Riflessioni spettanti a' ripari necessarj per mantere l'imboccatura del Ticino nel canale detto il Naviglio grande di Milano, 1757

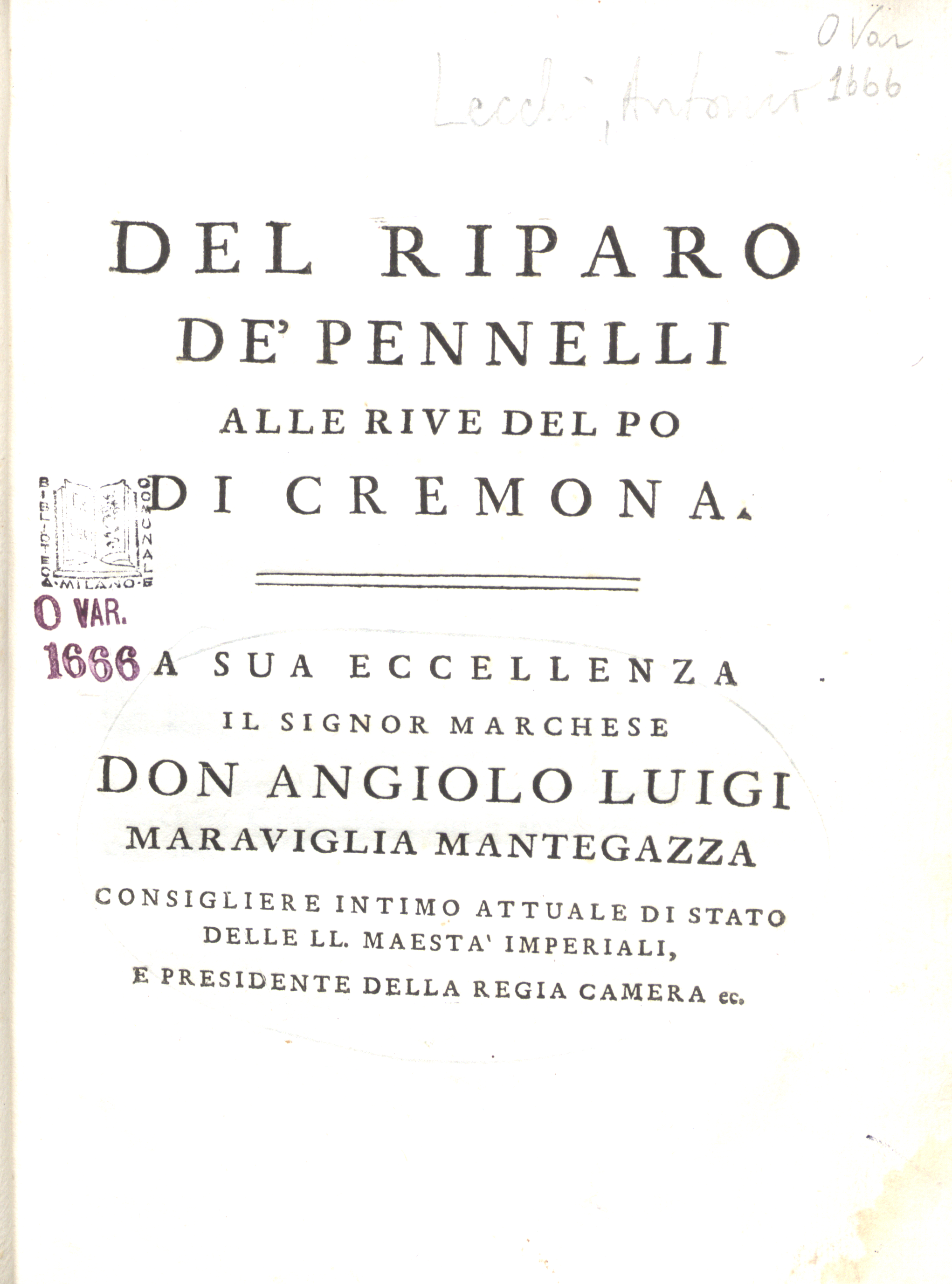
Del riparo de' pennelli alle rive del Po di Cremona, 1758

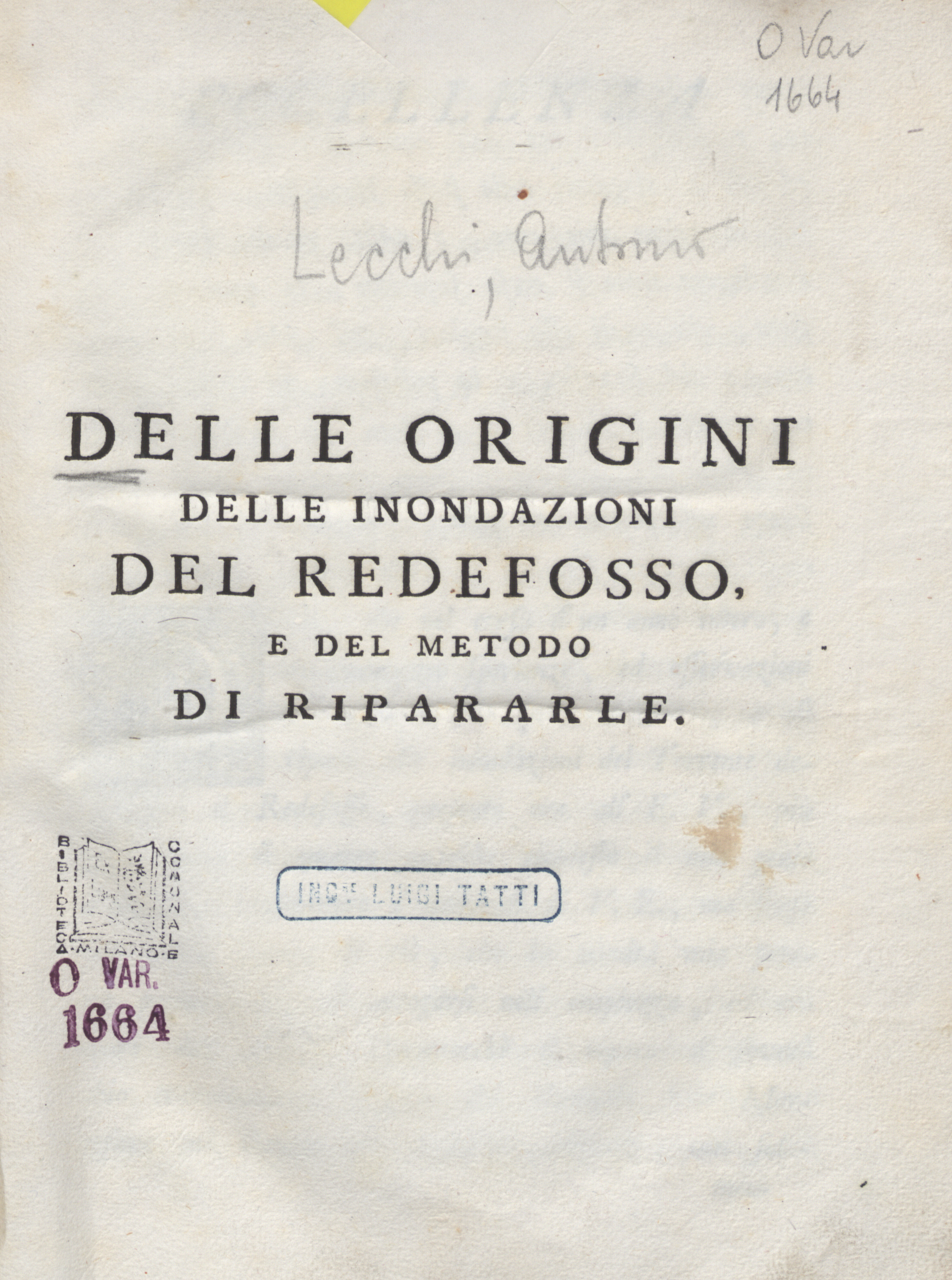
Delle origini delle inondazioni del Redefosso, 1761

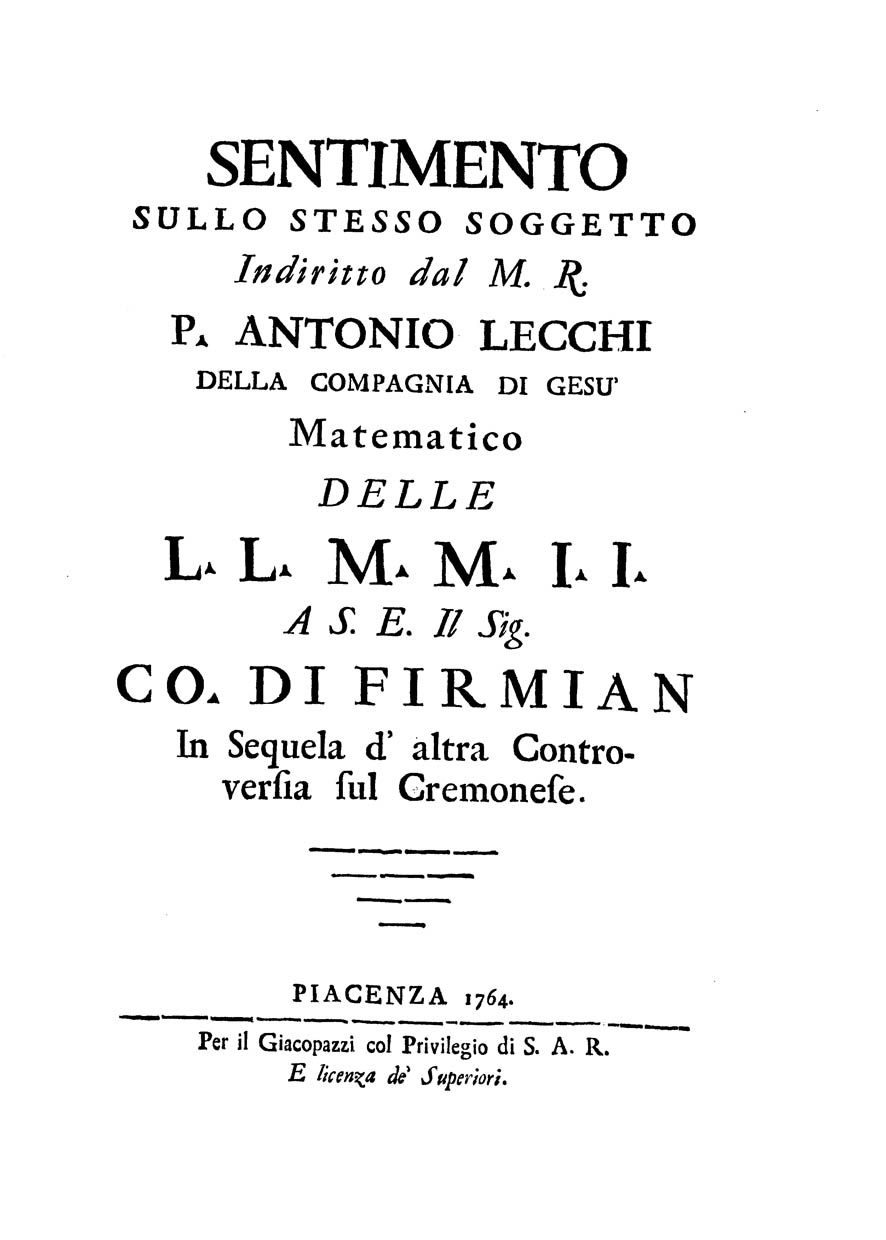
Sentimento sullo stesso soggetto in sequela d'altra controversia sul Cremonese, 1764

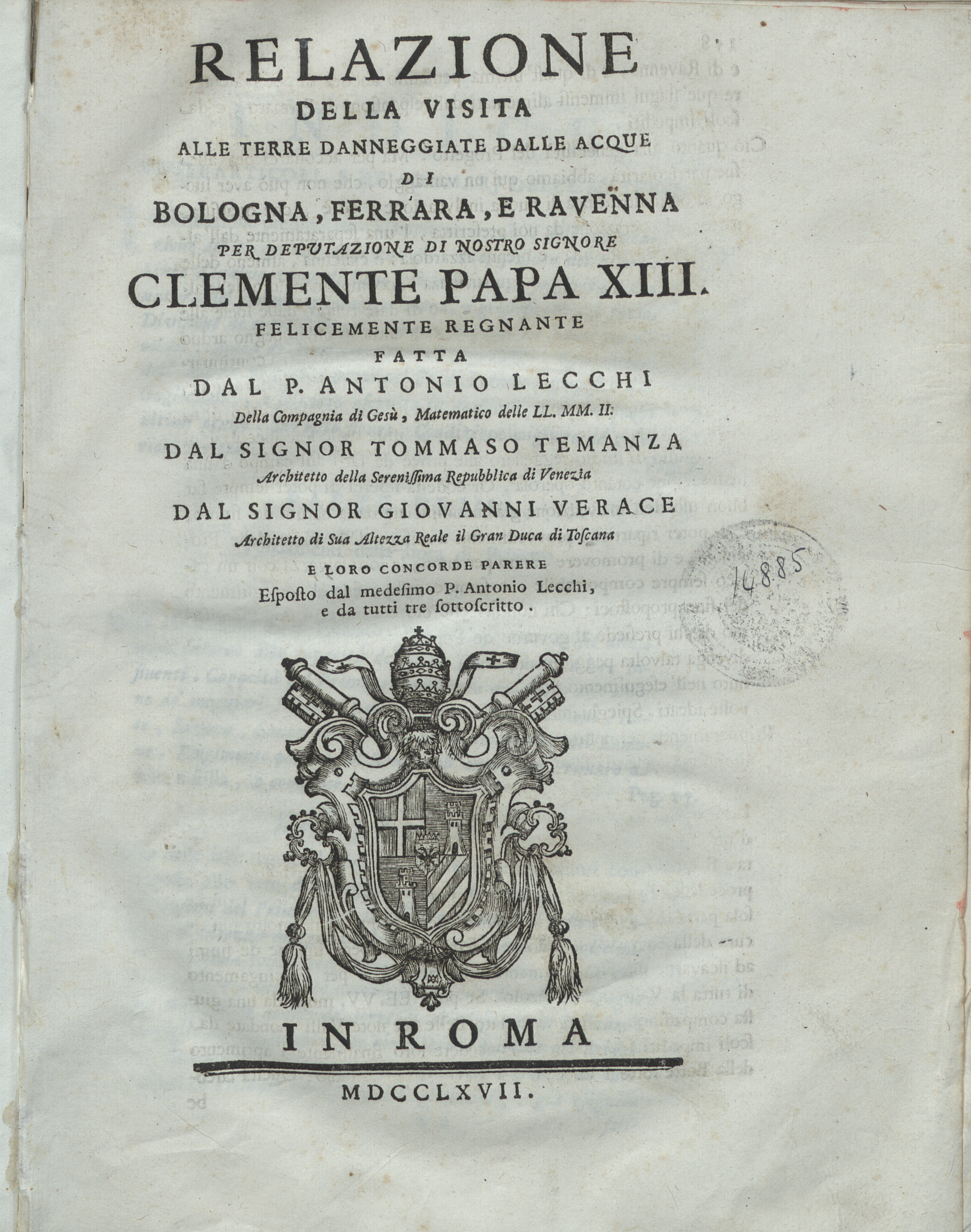
Relazione della visita alle terre danneggiate dalle acque di Bologna, Ferrara e Ravenna, 1767

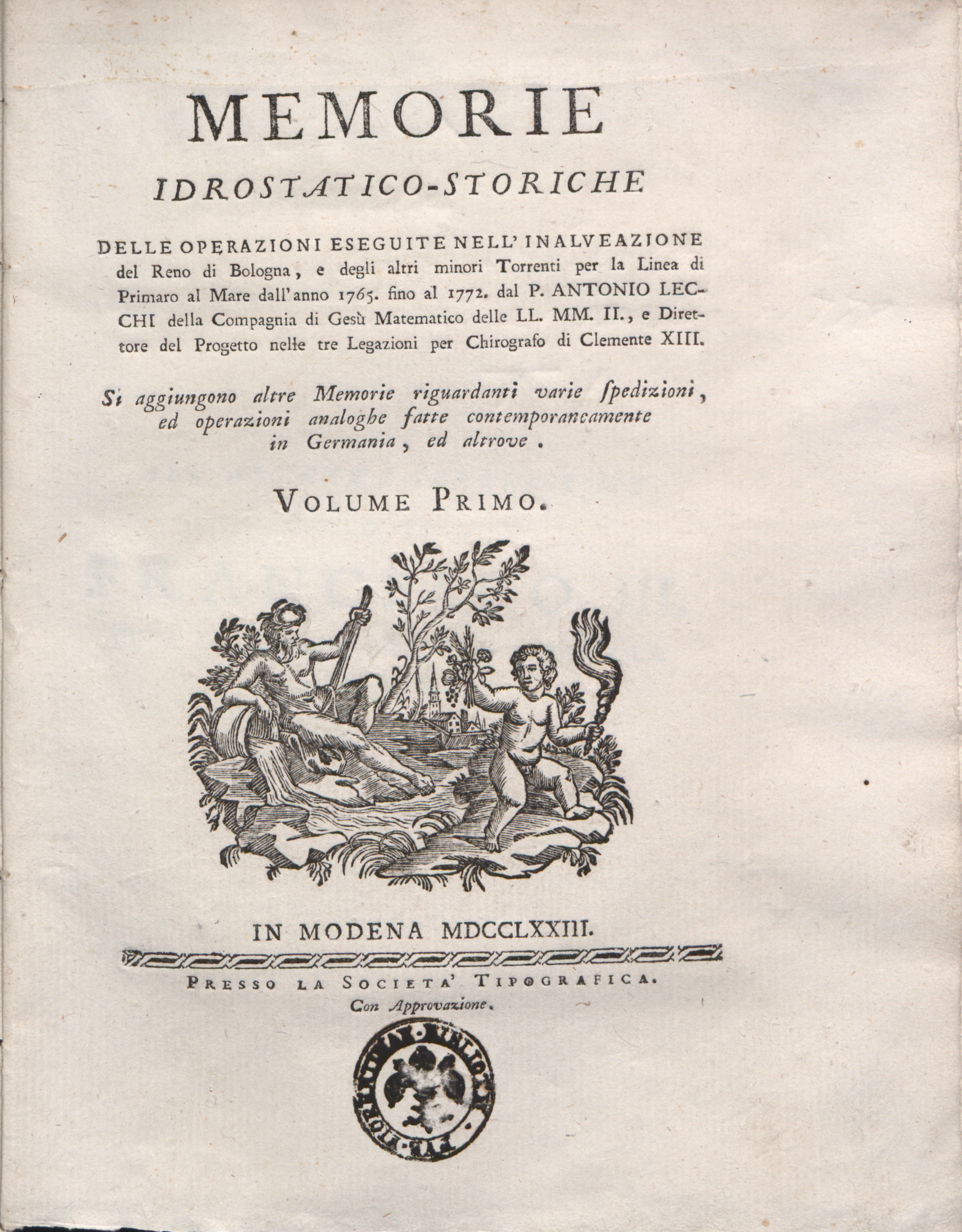
Memorie idrostatico-storiche, vol. I, 1773

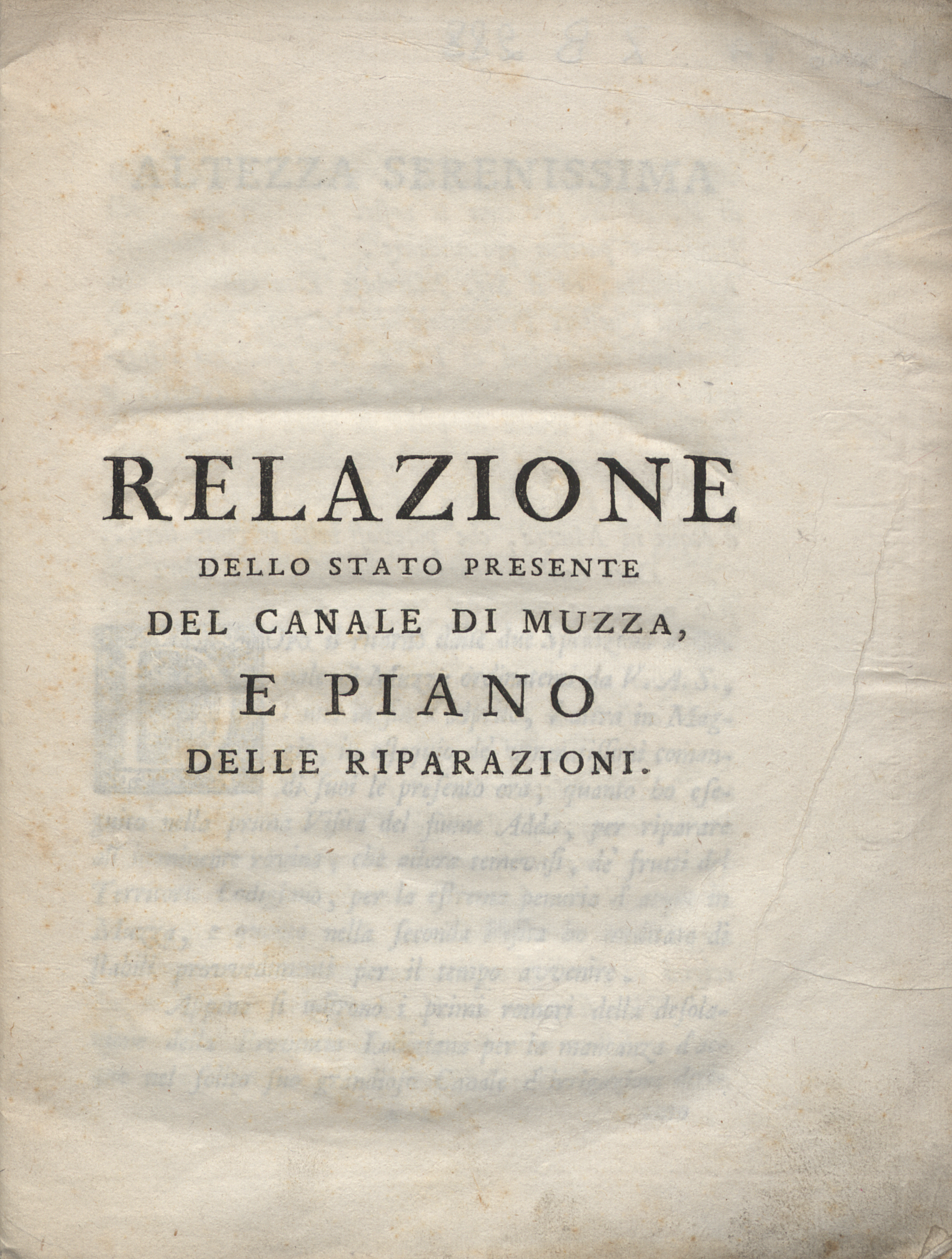
Relazione dello stato presente del canale di Muzza, n.d.

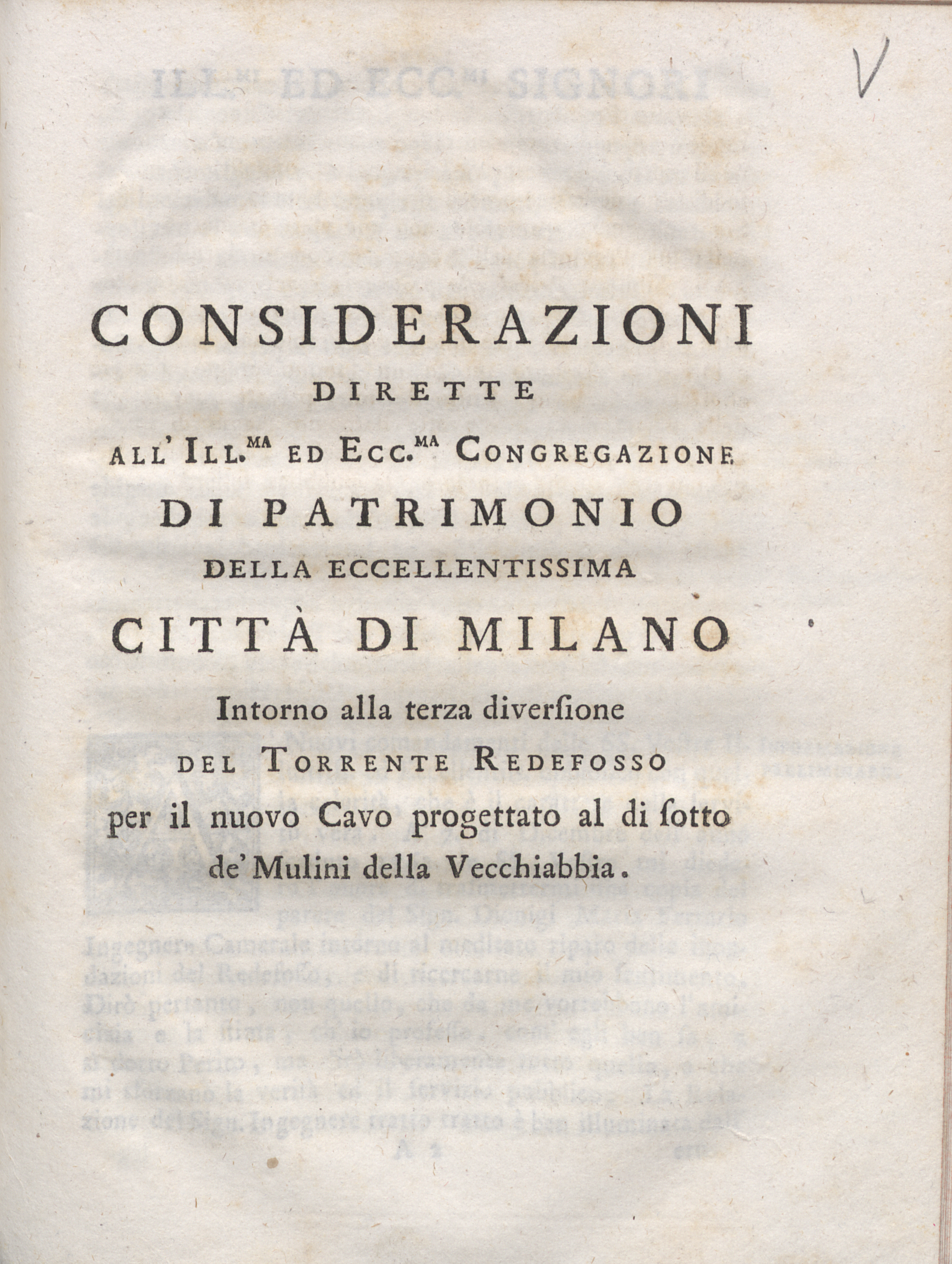
Considerazioni intorno alla terza diversione del torrente Redefosso, n.d.

== Sources ==
- Fabroni, Angelo (1799). Vitae Italorum doctrina excellentium. Vol. XVIII. Pisis: apud Petrum Jacomellium. pp. 229–245.
- Arrigoni, Giuseppe (1837). "Lecchi (Giannantonio)". In E. De Tipaldo (ed.). Biografie degli italiani illustri. Vol. V. Venice: tipogria di Alvisopoli. pp. 160–162.
- Sommervogel, Carlos (1893). Bibliotheque de la Compagnie de Jésus. Vol. IV. Brussels-Paris: Schepens-Picard. pp. 1633–1638.
- Brambilla, Elena (2005). "LECCHI, Giovanni Antonio". Dizionario Biografico degli Italiani (in Italian). Vol. 64: Latilla–Levi Montalcini. Rome: Istituto dell'Enciclopedia Italiana. ISBN 978-88-12-00032-6.
- Fiocca, Alessandra (2002). "Ferrara e i gesuiti periti in materia d'acque". Gesuiti e università in Europa: secoli XVI-XVIII. Bologna: CLUEB. pp. 339–359. doi:10.1400/35009.
- Di Fidio, Mario; Gandolfi, Claudio (2014). Idraulici italiani (PDF). Milan: Fondazione Biblioteca Europea di Informazione e Cultura. pp. 191–202. Archived from the original (PDF) on 4 August 2021.
- Lugaresi, Maria Giulia (2017). "Jesuit connections: Ruggiero G. Boscovich and Giovanni A. Lecchi". Annali di Storia delle università italiane, Rivista semestrale. 21 (2): 245–266. doi:10.17396/88315. ISSN 1127-8250.
