= John Giannantonio =

American football player

Profile
- Position: Halfback

Personal information
- Born: c. 1934; Netcong, New Jersey, U.S.
- Listed height: 5 ft 7 in (1.70 m)

Career information
- High school: Netcong
- College: Villanova (1954–1956)

John Giannantonio (born c. 1934) is an American former football player who set several national high school football records, many which still stand. As a 5 ft 7 in (1.70 m), 137 lb (62 kg) sophomore at the now-defunct Netcong High School in Netcong, New Jersey in 1950, Giannantonio rushed for 4,756 yards and 41 touchdowns over the team's eight-game season. During a game in November that season against Mountain Lakes High School he rushed for 754 yards and nine touchdowns in a 61–0 win. His 594.5 rushing yards per game average and single-game rushing yards against Mountain Lakes remain national high school records as of 2025.

As a junior at Netcong, Giannantonio rushed for 38 touchdowns and had a 514-yard game. He then transferred to Bolles School in Jacksonville, Florida as a senior, but due to transfer rules, in order to retain his academic eligibility he did not play on the football team. After high school, he was offered a two-year scholarship to Notre Dame and a four-year scholarship to Villanova. He chose to attend Villanova and played on the varsity football team for three years but was unable to replicate his success from high school. After his playing career, he returned to New Jersey and taught mathematics in the Andover Regional School District at Andover Regional Middle School for 38 years before retiring in 1995.

== See also ==
- Kenneth Hall (American football)
