= Gian =

- Pronunciation: Italian: [dʒan]
- Gender: Male

Origin
- Origin: Italy

Other names
- Related names: Giovanni, Gianni, Jean

Gian is a given name of Italian origin. It is a shortened version of Giovanni, another name of Italian origin.

== Notable people ==
Notable people whose name is now typically expressed as Gian include:

- Gian Paolo Lomazzo, Italian painter
- Gian Lorenzo Bernini, Italian sculptor
- Gian Rinaldo Carli, Italian count, economist, and antiquarian
- Gian Gastone de' Medici, Grand Duke of Tuscany
- Gian Francesco Albani, Italian Catholic cardinal
- Gian Francesco Malipiero, Italian composer
- Gian Galeazzo Visconti, First Lord of Milan
- Gian Galeazzo Sforza, Sixth Lord of Milan
- Gian Marco Berti (born 1982), Sammarinese sports shooter
- Gian Marco Centinaio, Italian politician
- Gian Croci, Argentine footballer
- Gian Pyres, British musician
- Gian Maria Volonté, former actor
- Gian Sammarco, former actor
- Gian Carlo Menotti, composer and librettist
- Gian Sotto, Filipino politician
- Gian Piero Ventura, Italian football manager
- Gian Piero Gasperini, Italian football manager
- Gian (footballer, born 1974) (Giancarlo Dias Dantas), Brazilian footballer
- Gian Francesco Gonçalves Mariano, known as Gian, Brazilian footballer
- Gian (footballer, born 2001) (Gianluca Muniz Estevam), Brazilian footballer
- Gian Singh, several people
- Gian Luigi Ferri, the perpetrator of the 101 California Street shooting.

== Other uses ==
- Gian, alternate name of Giyan, a city in Iran
- Gian, nickname of Takeshi Goda, a character in Doraemon

== See also ==
- Giovanni and Gianni, for other people whose names may appear as Gian
- Gianbattista
- Gianpaolo
