= Harinder Singh Giani =

Indian lawyer

Harinder Singh Giani (2 September 1938 – 9 February 2007)

Harinder Singh Giani (born 2 September 1938 at Gujranwala and died 9 February 2007 at Chandigarh) was an eminent jurist, who practiced at the bar of the Punjab and Haryana High Court at Chandigarh for over 42 years. He was the Senior Central Government Standing Counsel in the mid-nineties. He was also a member of the committee set up to draft a new constitution for the Diwan.

He was the grandson of Pratap Singh Giani, the eminent Sikh scholar and calligrapher. He was the son of Kartar Singh Gyani, a judge of the Sikh Gurudwara Judicial Commission, Amritsar.

He remained the president of the Local Committee, Chandigarh of the Chief Khalsa Diwan for over a decade and dedicated a large part of his spare time to it and for the Guru Harkrishan Public School, Chandigarh.
