= Gianni =

- Pronunciation: Italian: [ˈdʒanni]
- Gender: Male

Origin
- Meaning: God is gracious
- Region of origin: Italian

Other names
- Related names: John, Giovanni

Gianni is an Italian name (occasionally a surname), a short form of the Italian Giovanni and a cognate of John, meaning God is gracious. Gianni is the most common diminutive of Giovanni in Italian.

== People with this given name ==
- Gianni Agnelli (1921–2003), industrialist
- Gianni Alemanno (born 1958), politician
- Gianni Amelio (born 1945), film director
- Gianni Baget Bozzo (1925–2009), Roman Catholic priest and political expert
- Gianni Bellocchi (born 1969), scientist
- Gianni Benvenuti (1926–2005), artist
- Gianni Berengo Gardin (1930–2025), photographer
- Gianni Brera (1919–1992), journalist
- Gianni Bugno (born 1964), cyclist
- Gianni Danzi (1940–2007), Roman Catholic bishop
- Gianni Davito (born 1957), high jumper
- Gianni De Biasi (born 1956), football coach
- Gianni De Fraja (born 1960), economics professor
- Gianni De Michelis (1940–2019), politician
- Gianni Garko (born 1935, Giovanni Garcovich), actor
- Gianni Ghidini (1930–1995), cyclist
- Gianni Infantino (born 1970), football administrator, president of FIFA (since 2016)
- Gianni Letta (born 1935), politician
- Gianni Mina (born 1992), tennis player
- Gianni Minà (1938–2023), journalist
- Gianni Morandi (born 1944), singer
- Gianni Morbidelli (born 1968), Formula One driver
- Gianni Motta (born 1943), cyclist
- Gianni Pettenati (1945–2025), singer
- Gianni Quaranta (1943–2025), production designer and art director
- Gianni Riotta (born 1954), journalist
- Gianni Rivera (born 1943), footballer
- Gianni Rodari (1920–1980), writer
- Gianni Romme (born 1973), skater
- Gianni Russo (born 1943), actor
- Gianni Spetic (born 2005), American football player
- Gianni Stensness (born 1999), footballer
- Gianni Togni (born 1956), singer
- Gianni Vattimo (1936–2023), philosopher
- Gianni Vella (1885–1977), artist
- Gianni Vernetti (born 1960), politician
- Gianni Versace (1946–1997), fashion designer
- Gianni Vignaduzzi (born 1966), track cyclist
- Gianni Zuiverloon (born 1986), footballer

== Fictional people with this name ==
- Gianni di Marco, a character on the British TV show Eastenders, portrayed by actor Marc Bannerman.

== See also ==
- Gianni (surname)
- Giani (disambiguation)
- Gianni di Parigi (opera)
- Gianni Schicchi (opera)
- Janni
- Yianni (disambiguation)
- Yanni (disambiguation)
- Johnny (disambiguation)
- Alternate forms for the name John
