= Michael John Hoban =

American prelate

His Excellency, The Most Reverend Michael John Hoban
- Bishop of Scranton; Titular Bishop of Alais
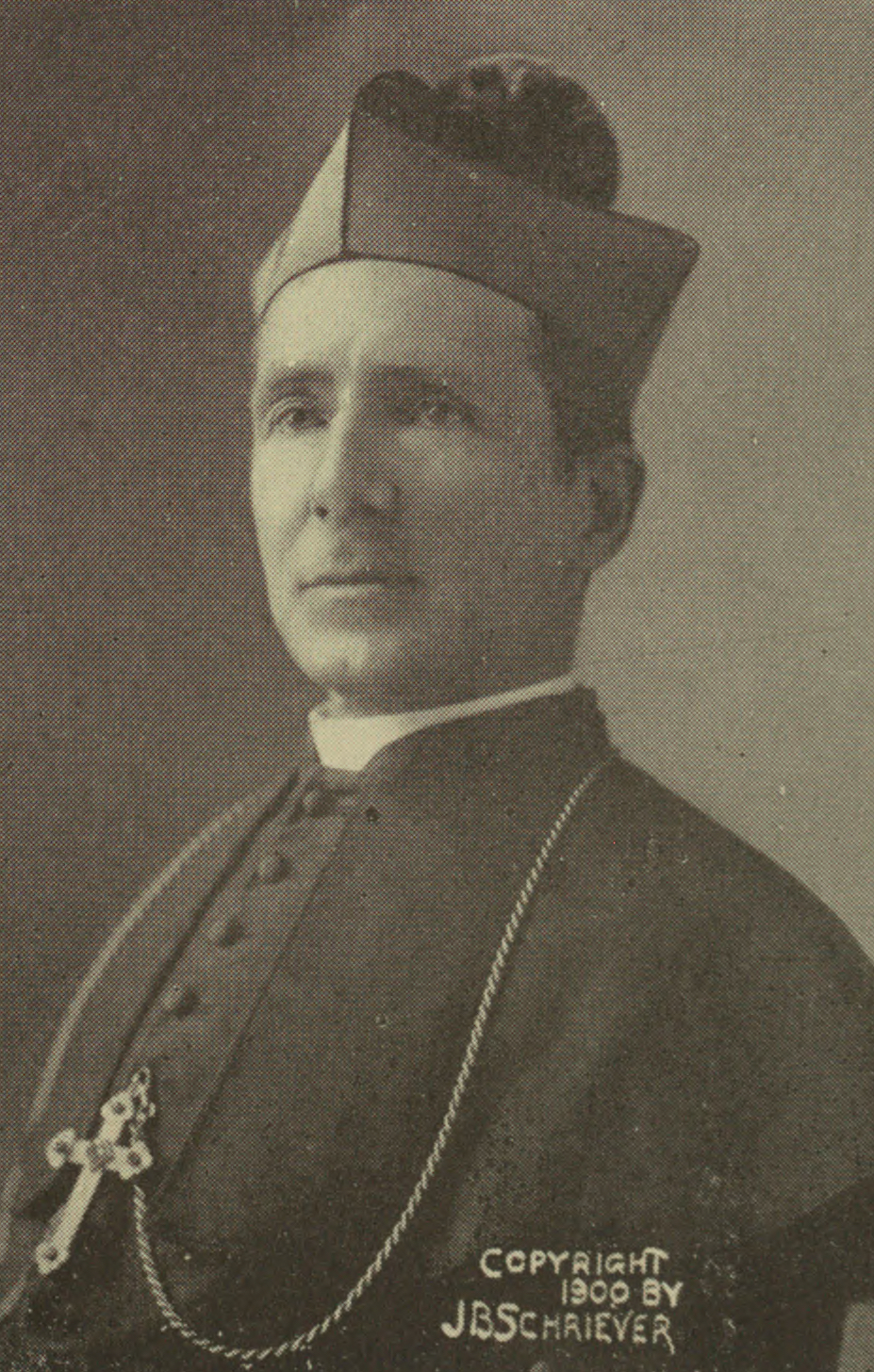
- Church: Roman Catholic Church
- See: Diocese of Scranton
- Appointed: February 1, 1896
- Predecessor: William O'Hara
- Successor: Thomas Charles O'Reilly
- Previous posts: Coadjutor Bishop of Scranton (1896-1899); Titular Bishop of Alais

Orders
- Ordination: May 22, 1880 by Raffaele Monaco La Valletta
- Consecration: March 22, 1896 by Francesco Satolli

Personal details
- Born: June 6, 1853 Waterloo Village, Byram Township, New Jersey, US
- Died: November 13, 1926 (aged 73) Scranton, Pennsylvania, US
- Education: College of the Holy Cross; St. Charles Borromeo Seminary; Pontifical North American College
- Motto: Attende tibi et doctrinae (Pay attention to yourself and your teaching)

Michael John Hoban (June 6, 1853 – November 13, 1926) was an American prelate of the Roman Catholic Church. He served as bishop of the Diocese of Scranton in Pennsylvania from 1899 until his death in 1926.

While Hoban was coadjutor bishop of Scranton, a schism occurred in the diocese. It resulted in a congregation leaving the Catholic Church to later form the Polish National Catholic Church in the United States.

== Biography ==
=== Early life ===
Michael Hoban was born on June 6, 1853, in Waterloo Village in Byram Township, New Jersey, to Patrick and Bridget (née Hennigan) Hoban. Both parents were Irish immigrants who met in New Jersey. Patrick Hoban was a railroad contractor working on a project in Waterloo Village. The family later moved to Hawley, Pennsylvania, for Patrick to work for a canal company.

Michael Hoban attended private primary schools in Hawley, then was sent by his parent to St. Francis Xavier's College in New York City at age 14. In 1868, after one year at St. Francis, Hoban entered the College of the Holy Cross in Worcester, Massachusetts. With the death of his father in 1871, Hoban dropped out of college to return to Hawley to help his mother with the family business.

Hoban later traveled to New York City to study at St. John's College in the Bronx. After one year at St. John's, he decided to enter the priesthood. He spent 1874 at St. Charles Borromeo Seminary in Philadelphia, Pennsylvania. In 1875, he was sent to Rome to reside at the Pontifical North American College while studying in that city.

=== Priesthood ===
While in Rome, Hoban was ordained to the priesthood for the Diocese of Scranton by Cardinal Raffaele Monaco La Valletta on May 22, 1880 in the Archbasilica of St. John Lateran.After his return to Pennsylvania in July 1880, the diocese assigned Hoban as a curate at Saints Peter and Paul Parish in Towanda, Pennsylvania. He was transferred in 1882 to be the curate at St. John's Parish in Pittston, Pennsylvania.

Hoban received his first pastorate in 1885 at St. John's Parish at Troy, Pennsylvania. In 1887, Hoban was named pastor of St. Leo's Parish in Ashley, Pennsylvania, where he built a church and rectory.

=== Coadjutor Bishop of Scranton ===
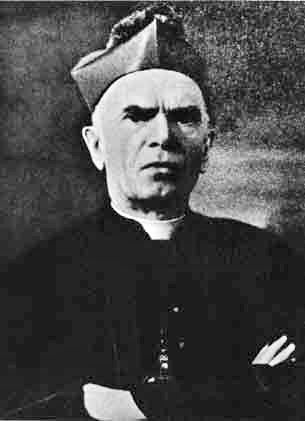
Reverend Franciszek Hodur (1907)

On February 1, 1896, Hoban was appointed as coadjutor bishop of Scranton and titular bishop of Alalis by Pope Leo XIII. He received his episcopal consecration on March 22, 1896, from Archbishop Francesco Satolli, with Bishops Thomas McGovern and Thomas Daniel Beaven serving as co-consecrators, at St. Peter's Cathedral in Scranton

Later in 1896, a schism erupted at Sacred Hearts Parish in the coal mining area of South Scranton. The English-speaking parishioners, mainly miners, feared that the influx of Polish immigrants into the mine fields would drive down wages. The Polish parishioners did not like how their pastor, an English-speaking priest of German descent, ran the parish. In October 1896, 250 Polish families left the parish. They built a new church and requested that the diocese recognize it as St. Stanislaus Parish. Hoban refused to recognized the parish.

In March 1887, Reverend Frances Hodur, a Polish priest, accepted the position of the first pastor of St. Stanislaus without approval from Hoban. Hoban suspended him the next week. In September 1898, Hodur submitted a compromise proposal to Hoban, which he rejected. Hodur then traveled to Rome to appeal his case, but the Vatican rejected it. In October 1898, Hoban excommunicated Hodur. He and the St. Stanislaus congregation eventually set up the Polish National Catholic Church, establishing a permanent break with the Roman Catholic Church.

=== Bishop of Scranton ===
Hoban automatically succeeded Bishop William O'Hara as bishop of the Diocese of Scranton on his death on February 3, 1899.

At the time of Hoban's succession in 1899, the diocese contained 152 priests, 100 parishes, and 32 parochial schools; by the time of his death in 1926, there were 341 priests, 202 parishes, 65 parochial schools, and three colleges.

=== Death ===
Michael Hoban died on November 13, 1926, in Scranton at age 73. He is buried at the Cathedral of Scranton.

Catholic Church titles
Preceded by William O'Hara	Bishop of Scranton; 1899–1926	Succeeded by Thomas Charles O'Reilly
