= Waterloo, New Jersey =

Waterloo, New Jersey may refer to:

- Waterloo, Monmouth County, New Jersey
- Waterloo Village, New Jersey in Byram Township, Sussex County
