= Allamuchy Mountain =

Mountain in New Jersey, USA

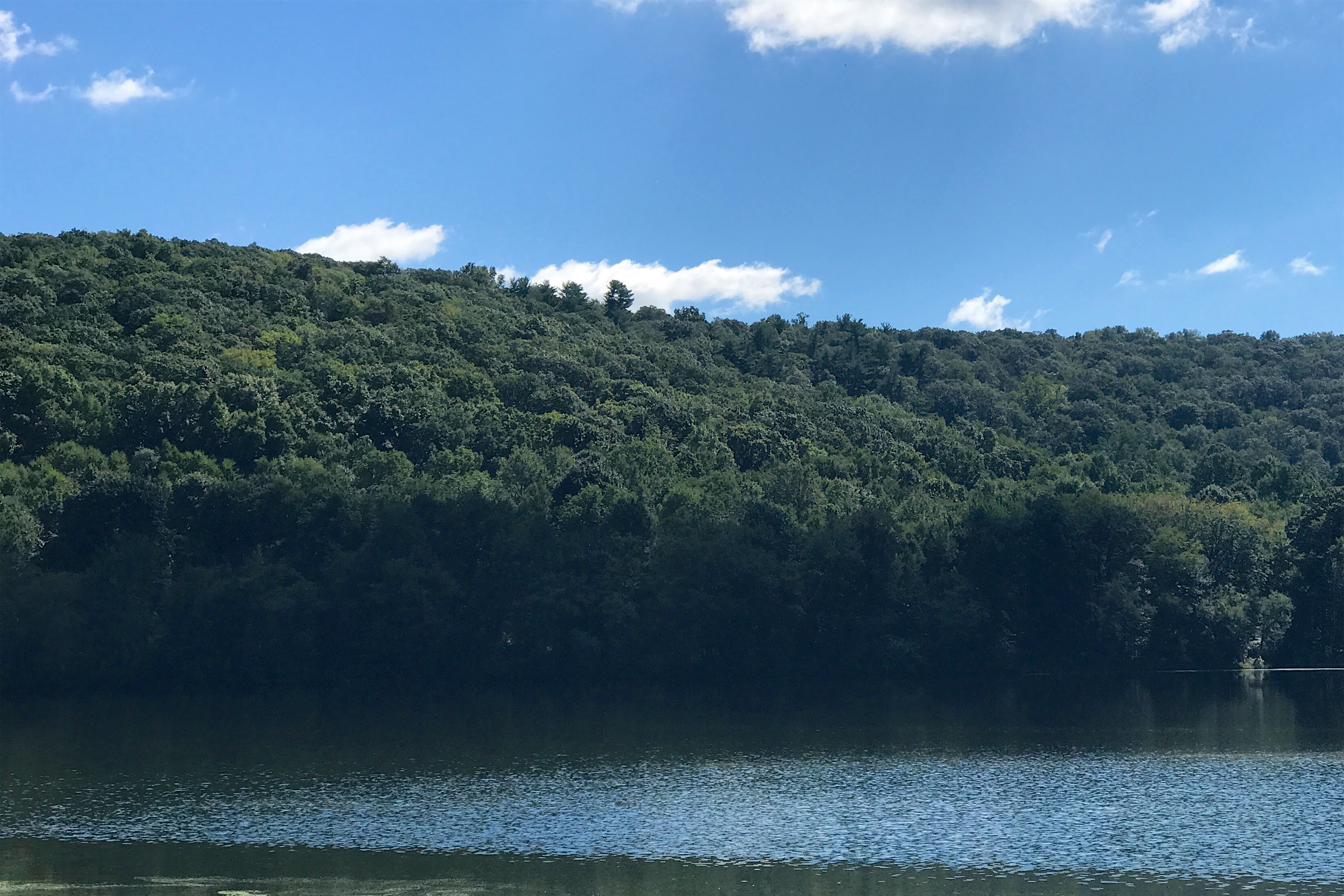
- View from Rutherfurd Hall estate

Highest point
- Elevation: 1,222 ft (372 m) NGVD 29
- Coordinates: 40°56′08″N 74°46′23″W

Geography
- Location within Sussex County, New Jersey Location within New Jersey Location within the United States
- Location: Sussex County, New Jersey, U.S.
- Topo map: USGS Tranquility

Climbing
- Easiest route: Hiking

Allamuchy Mountain is a mountain in Sussex and Warren Counties, New Jersey. The major peak rises to 1,222 feet (372 m), and is located in Byram Township. The mountain also covers portions of Allamuchy Township in Warren County and Green Township in Sussex County. It overlooks the Musconetcong River to the southeast, and forms part of the divide between that river and the Pequest to the northwest. It is part of the New York–New Jersey Highlands of the Reading Prong.

Allamuchy Mountain State Park covers portions of the mountain.

== History ==
An 1834 description read,

Alamuche Mountain is one of the chain of hills which bounds the valley of the Musconetcong creek in Warren county.
