= William O'Hara =

Irish-born American prelate

His Excellency, The Right Reverend William O'Hara
- Bishop of Scranton
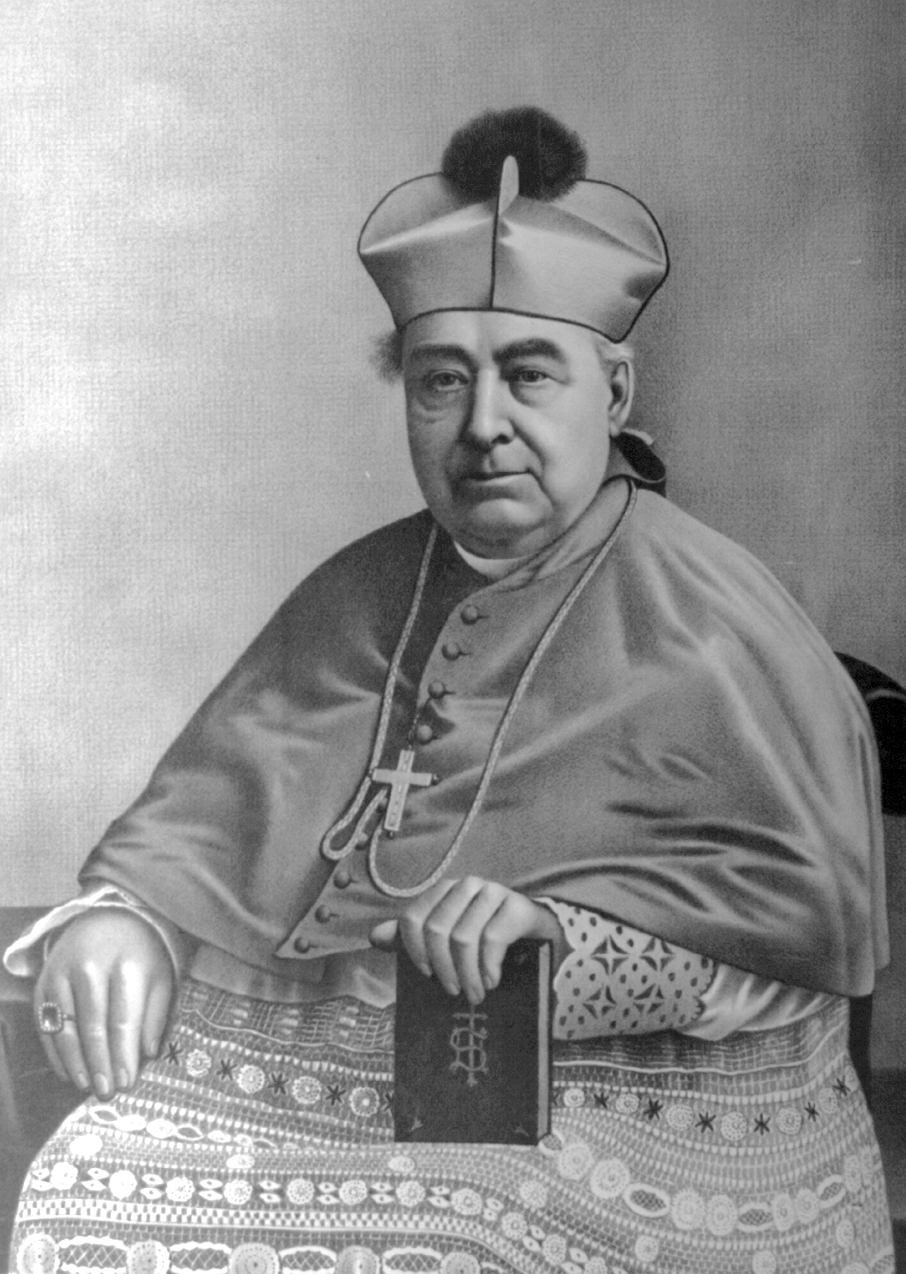
- Diocese: Diocese of Scranton
- Appointed: March 3, 1868
- Term ended: February 3, 1899 (his death)
- Predecessor: Office established
- Successor: Michael John Hoban

Orders
- Ordination: December 21, 1842 by Giacomo Filippo Fransoni
- Consecration: July 12, 1868 by James Frederick Wood

Personal details
- Born: April 14, 1816 Dungiven, County Londonderry, Ireland
- Died: February 3, 1899 (aged 82) Scranton, Pennsylvania, U.S.
- Motto: Victoria nostra fides (Victory is our faith)

William O'Hara (April 14, 1816 – February 3, 1899) was an Irish-born American prelate of the Catholic Church. He was the first bishop of the Diocese of Scranton in Pennsylvania, serving from 1868 until his death in 1899. He founded St. Thomas College in 1888.

== Biography ==
=== Early life and education ===
William O'Hara was born April 14, 1816, in Dungiven, County Londonderry, in Ireland, to Thomas and Mary Louisa (née Miller) O'Hara. His mother was a member of the Church of Ireland, but converted to Catholicism soon after marriage. The family moved to the United States in 1820, settling in Philadelphia, Pennsylvania. O'Hara received his early education in that city and later attended Georgetown College in Washington, D.C.

In 1834, having decided to become a priest, O’Hara applied to Bishop Francis Kenrick for acceptance as a seminarian for the Diocese of Philadelphia. Kenrick sent him to the Urban College of the Propaganda in Rome, where he completed his philosophical and theological studies. While there, O’Hara befriended fellow seminarian James Andrew Corcoran, who would become a prominent theologian.

=== Priesthood ===
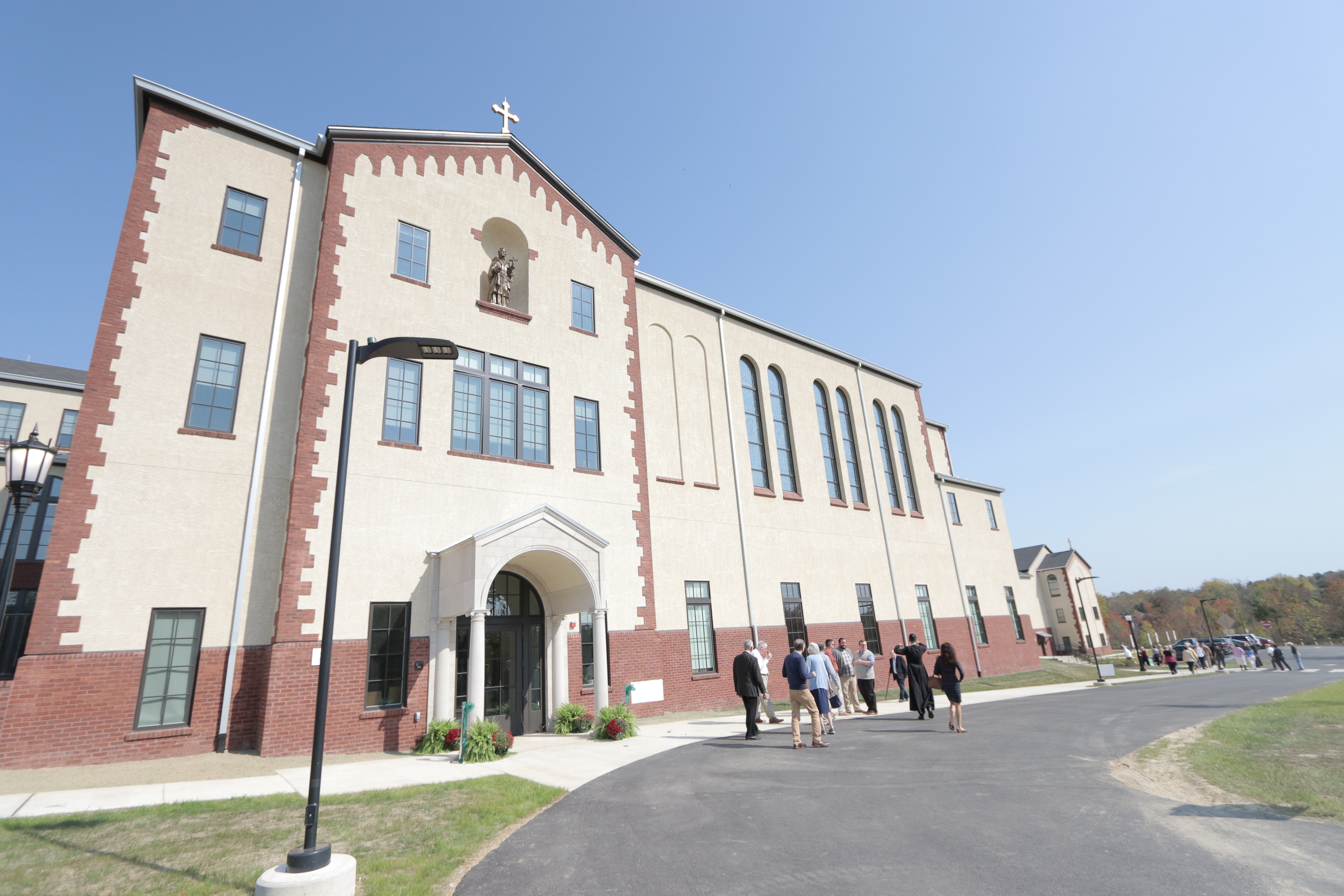
Saint Charles Borromeo Seminary, Lower Gwynedd, Pennsylvania (2024)

O'Hara was ordained to the priesthood in Rome on December 21, 1842, by Cardinal Giacomo Filippo Fransoni at the Archbasilica of Saint John Lateran. Upon his return to Philadelphia in February 1843, the diocese assigned him as assistant pastor of St. Patrick's Parish in the city. He held that position for thirteen years (1843–1856), also assisting in parishes in Philadelphia, Chambersburg, Pennsylvania, and Honesdale, Pennsylvania.

In addition to his pastoral duties, O’Hara was named rector of St. Charles Borromeo Seminary in Philadelphia in 1853 by Bishop John Neumann. He also taught moral theology at the seminary. Neumann promoted in 1856 O’Hara to full pastor of St. Patrick's Parish. During his time as pastor, he enlarged the church and built a new rectory. He renovated the parochial school, and brought in the Sisters of St. Joseph and the Christian Brothers to staff it. After leaving Philadelphia, O’Hara would return to St. Patrick's to celebrate mass on Saint Patrick's Day for many years.

O’Hara was named vicar general of the diocese in 1860 by Bishop James Wood, leaving the seminary, but remaining at St. Patrick's Church. In 1866 he served as an official at the Second Plenary Council of Baltimore in Baltimore, Maryland.

=== Bishop of Scranton ===
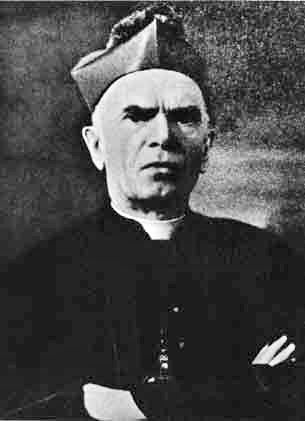
Reverend Franciszek Hodur (1907)

On March 3, 1868, O'Hara was appointed the first bishop of the newly erected Diocese of Scranton by Pope Pius IX. He received his episcopal consecration on July 12, 1868, from Bishop Wood, with Bishops William Elder and Patrick Lynch serving as co-consecrators, at the Cathedral of Sts. Peter and Paul in Philadelphia.

The Vatican had separated the Diocese of Scranton from the territory of the Archdiocese of Philadelphia. It consisted of ten counties in Northeastern Pennsylvania. When O'Hara became bishop, the diocese had a Catholic population of 25,000 with 47 churches, 25 priests, and two parochial schools with four students. By the time of O'Hara's death 31 years later, there were 125,000 Catholics, 78 churches, 130 priests, and 40 parochial schools with 12,000 students. In 1888, he founded St. Thomas College for Young Men in Scranton. It is today the University of Scranton.

Early in his tenure, O'Hara attended the First Vatican Council in Rome (1869–1870), where he voted in favor of papal infallibility.He spent a decade in court after a priest sued the bishop for removing him from his position as pastor of the Church of the Annunciation Parish in Williamsport, Pennsylvania. The Supreme Court of Pennsylvania finally ruled in O'Hara's favor in 1881. He ordained Reverend Francis Hodur, a Polish priest who would later break with the Catholic Church under O'Hara's successor and establish the Polish National Catholic Church.

O'Hara recognized the golden jubilee of his priestly ordination in 1892 and the silver jubilee of his episcopal consecration the following year. Given his advanced age, he requested that the Vatican appoint coadjutor bishop to assist and eventually succeed him. He received Bishop Michael John Hoban in 1896.

William O'Hara died in Scranton on February 3, 1899, at age 82. At the time of his death, he was the oldest Catholic bishop in the United States. He was buried under the main altar of St. Peter's Cathedral before being exhumed and re-interred at Cathedral Cemetery in Scranton.

Catholic Church titles
New creation	Bishop of Scranton; 1868-1899	Succeeded by Michael John Hoban
