= Geraldine R. Dodge Foundation =

Nonprofit organization in New Jersey, United States

- Formation: 1974
- Type: Philanthropic organization
- Headquarters: Newark, New Jersey, U.S.
- Revenue: $35,786,409 (2022)
- Expenses: $22,091,255 (2022)
- Website: www.grdodge.org

The Geraldine R. Dodge Foundation is an American philanthropic organization based in Newark, New Jersey, which supports organizations working to close the racial wealth gap across New Jersey. The foundation believes that philanthropy includes not only providing resources, but also connecting leaders across sectors, sharing expertise, and promoting collaboration to help build movements for change in important matters. It funds New Jersey-focused organizations working towards a just and equitable state, focusing on housing choice and economic mobility. The foundation announced its decision to shift it headquarters to Newark in 2023 to better advance its mission.

== History ==
The Dodge Foundation was established in 1974 through a bequest from Mrs. Geraldine Dodge, daughter of William and Almira Rockefeller, and has grown to become one of the largest private foundations in New Jersey. Since its inception, Dodge has awarded nearly $500 million in grants. It awards about $11 million in grants annually through three grant cycles. Chris Daggett became president and CEO of the foundation in 2010, and Tanuja M. Dehne became president and CEO in 2019. In June 2025, Samra Haider became president and CEO of the Foundation.

== Major initiatives ==
In 1986, the Dodge Foundation launched the biennial Geraldine R. Dodge Poetry Festival, the largest poetry event in North America, and in the following year spawned a complementary Poetry-in-the-Schools Program.

In the aftermath of Superstorm Sandy, the foundation provided a lead gift to the New Jersey Recovery Fund, hosted by the Community Foundation of New Jersey with support from local and national foundations, New Jersey corporations and individuals. The New Jersey Recovery Fund, one of the top philanthropic supporters of the state's Sandy recovery, awarded 25 grants totaling more than $4 million to groups working to address the Sandy recovery in several key areas: planning and environment, public information and engagement, community health, and the arts.
