= Sussex Branch Trail =

Rail trail in Sussex County, New Jersey, USA

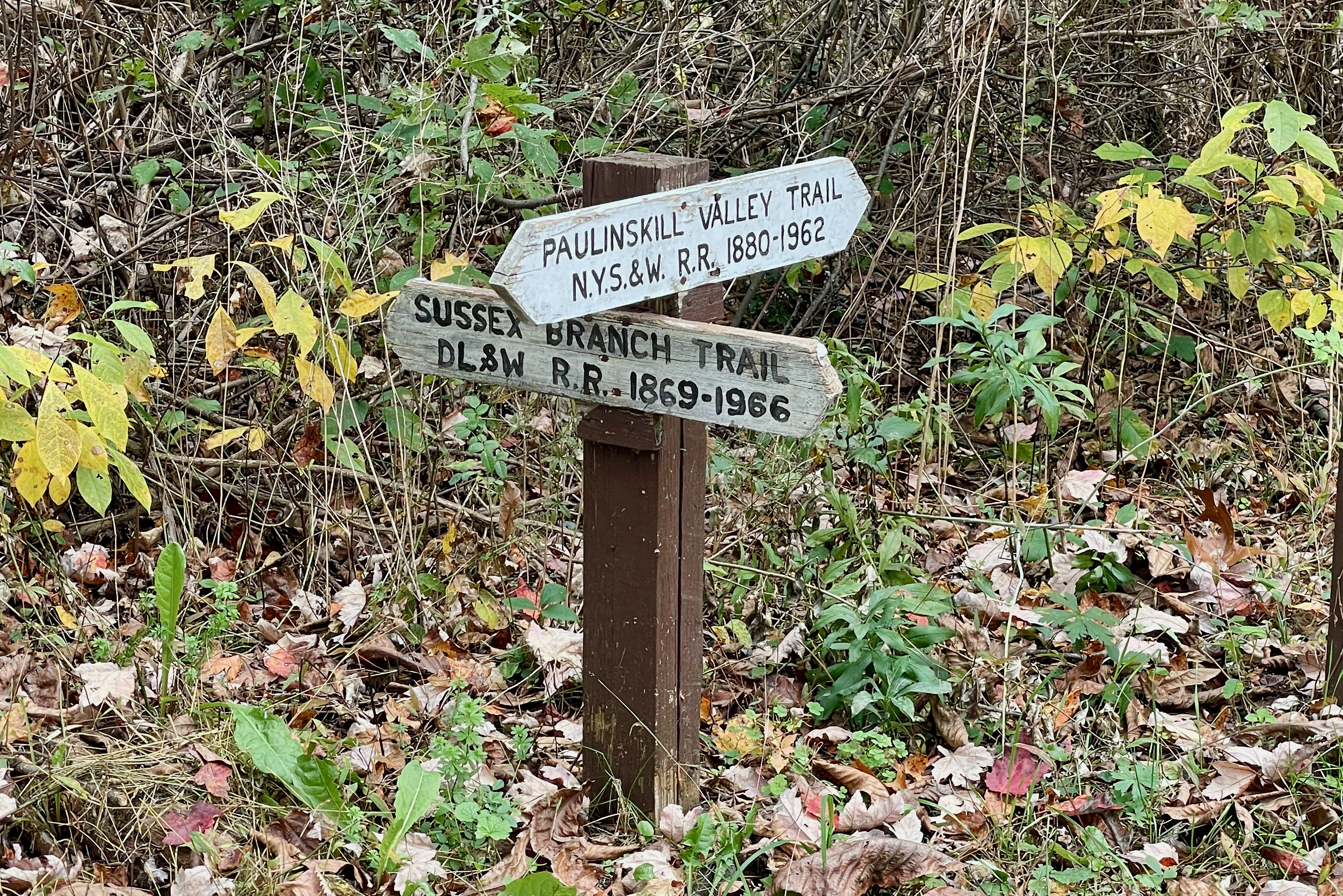
- Junction between the Paulinskill Valley and Sussex Branch trails
- Length: 20 mi (32 km)
- Location: Sussex County, New Jersey
- Trailheads: Bryam Township @ Waterloo Road; Branchville Borough
- Use: Hiking, Mountain cycling
- Difficulty: Easy
- Season: Year round
- Surface: Gravel, Ballast, Grass, Dirt, Cinder
- Right of way: Sussex Branch of the Erie Lackawanna Railroad

The Sussex Branch Trail is a rail trail in New Jersey, United States, with a total length of 20 miles (32 km).

The Sussex Branch Trail follows a portion of the Sussex Branch line of the former Erie Lackawanna Railroad (and predecessor Delaware, Lackawanna and Western Railroad that traverses through Sussex County from Allamuchy Mountain State Park in Byram Township to Branchville. New Jersey acquired the right-of-way for the trail in two transactions during 1979 and 1982.

The trail transects swamps, lakes, fields and several small communities. There are many features of the trail's former life as a railroad, including cuts through bedrock, underpasses for farm equipment and bridges crossing the Pequest River and Paulinskill River. It goes under the Pequest Fill south of Andover. The cinder base of the trail is suitable for hiking, horseback riding, biking and cross-country skiing. The Sussex Branch Trail also crosses through Kittatinny Valley State Park.

The Sussex Branch Trail intersects the Paulinskill Valley Trail at Warbasse Junction just north of Newton as well as the 3.5-mile Great Valley Rail Trail in Augusta, south of Branchville, New Jersey.

== Gallery ==
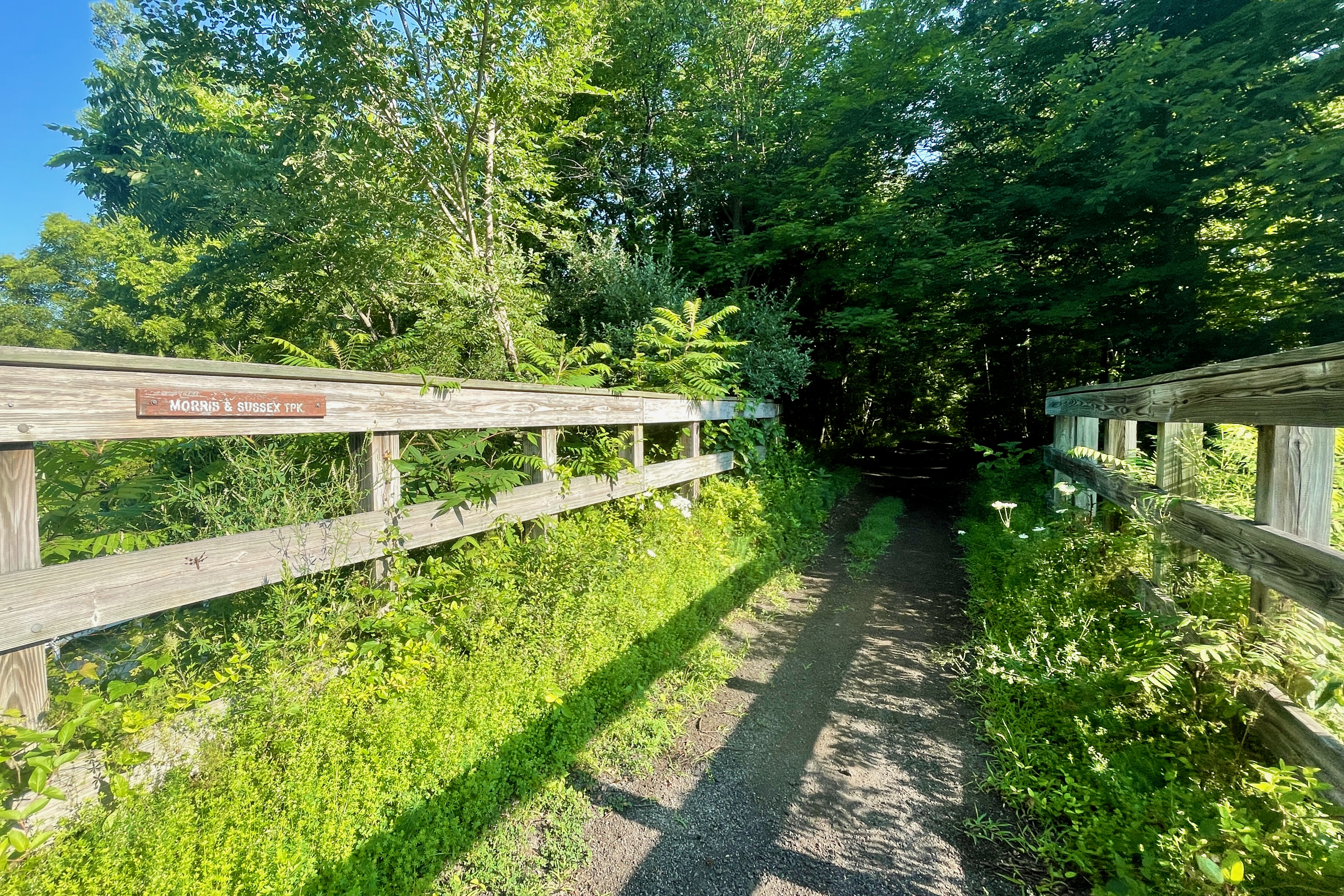
Overpass for the Morris and Sussex Turnpike

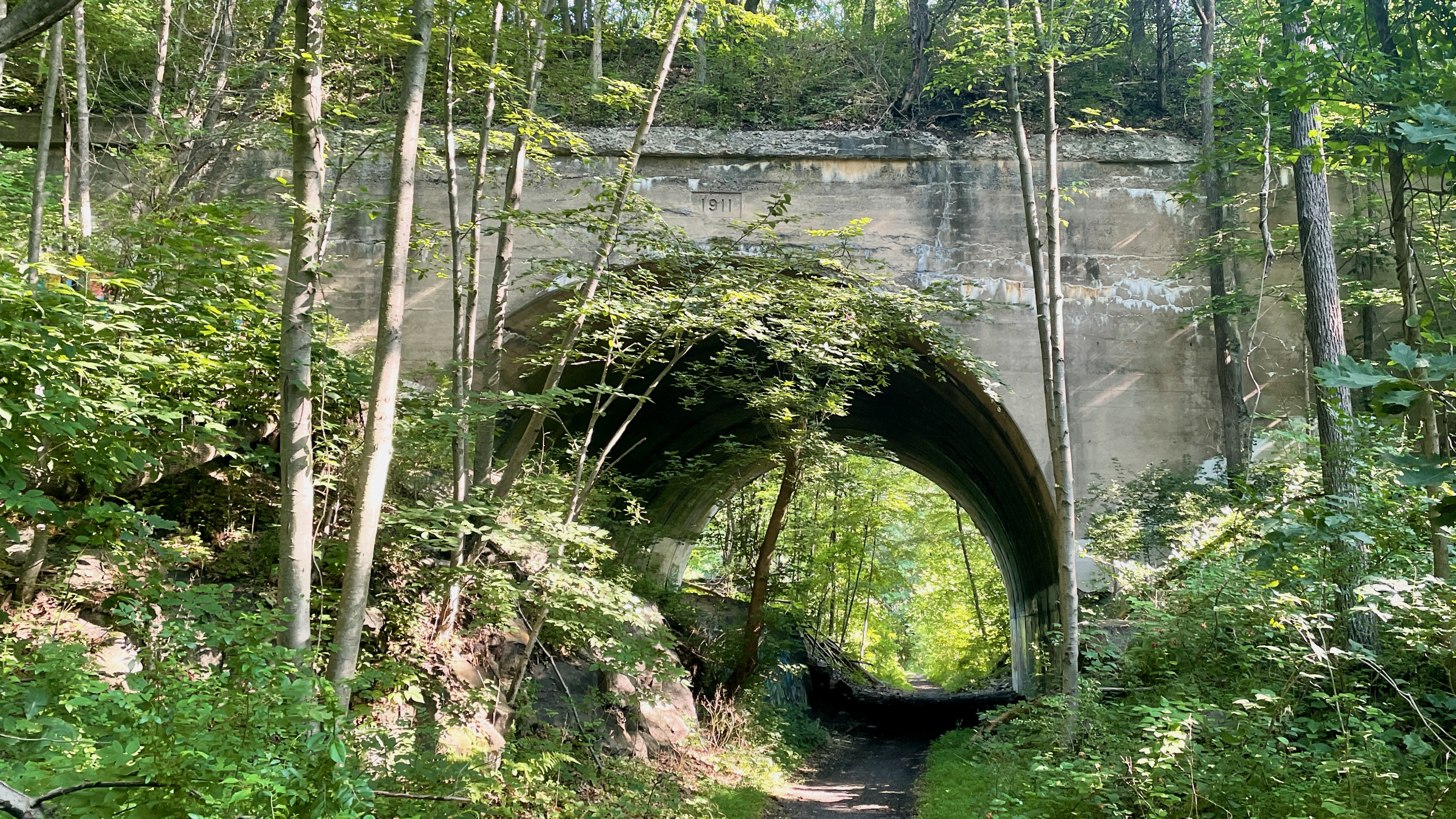
Underpass for the Pequest Fill

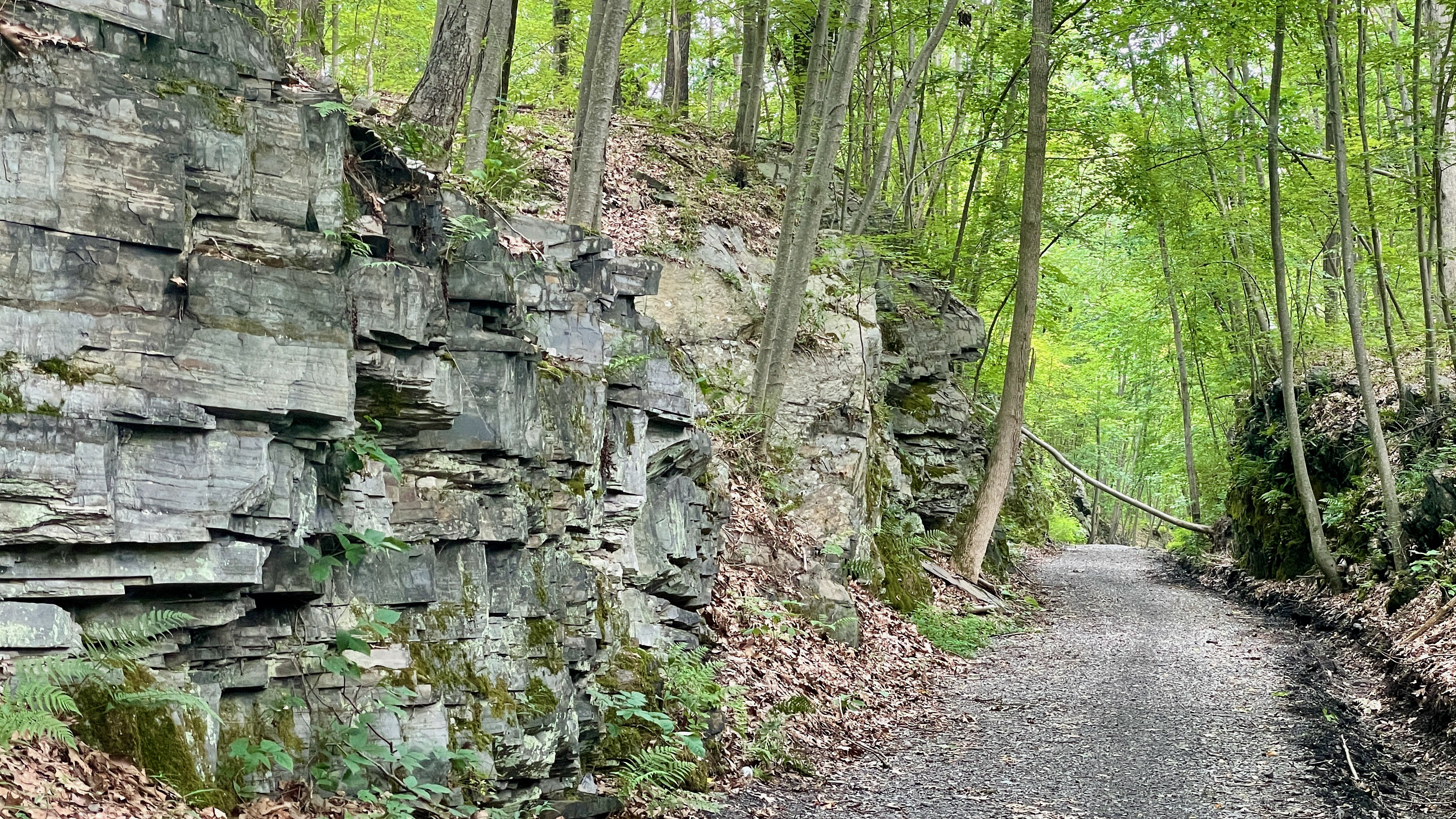
Bedrock cut, the "Slate Cut"
