= Byram Township, New Jersey =

Township in Sussex County, New Jersey, US

- Township
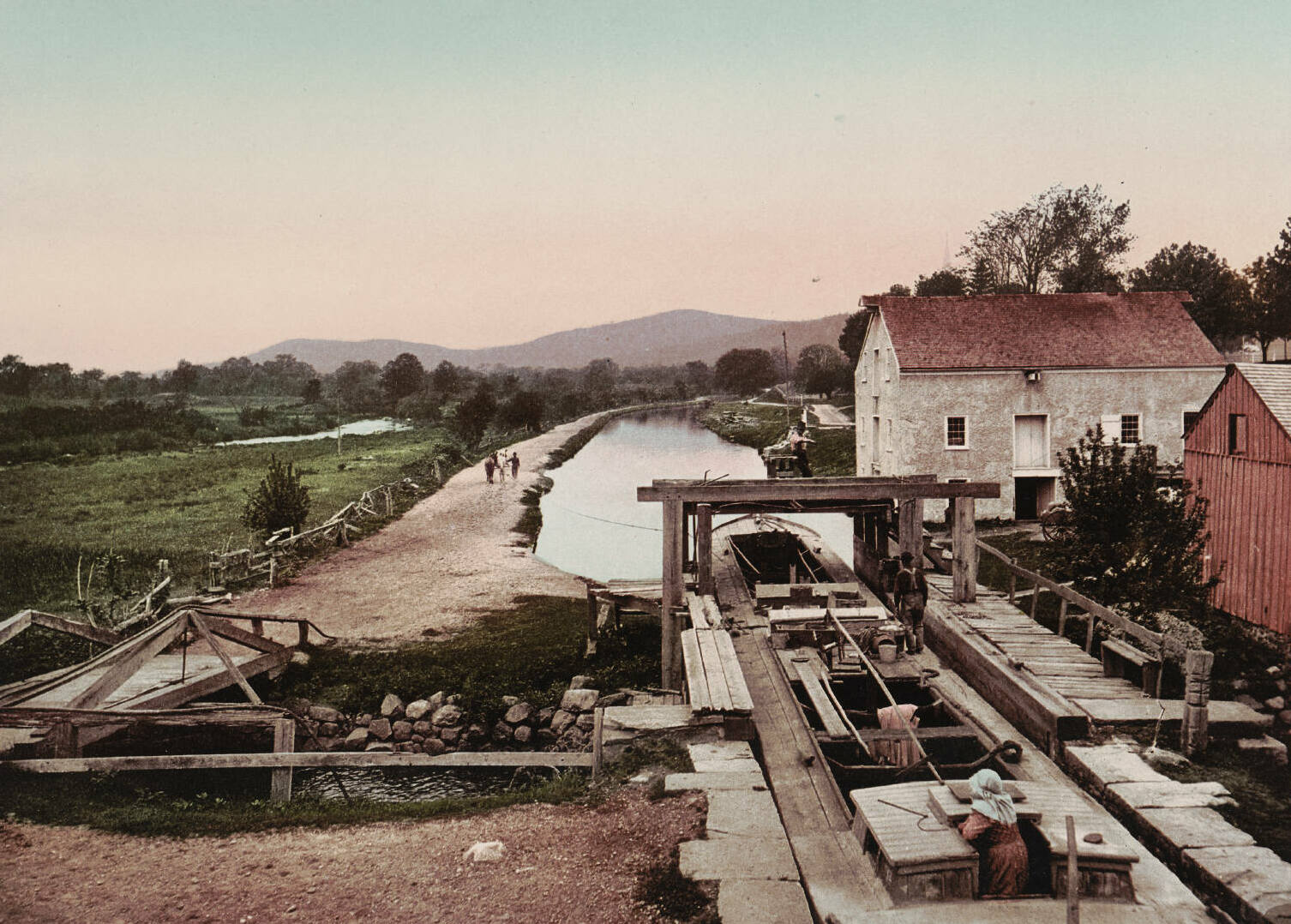
- Morris Canal at Waterloo Village in an early postcard

- Seal
- Nickname: "The Township of Lakes"
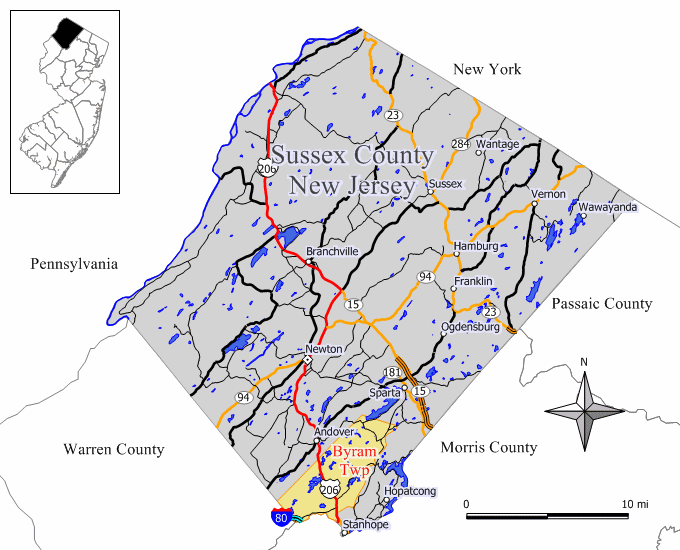
- Map of Byram Township in Sussex County. Inset: Location of Sussex County highlighted in the State of New Jersey.

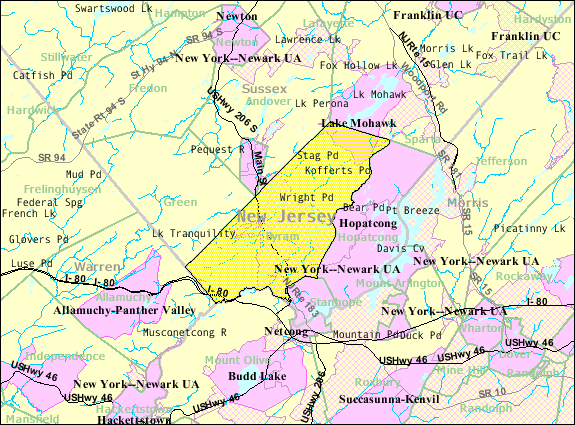
- Census Bureau map of Byram Township, New Jersey

- Location in Sussex County Location in New Jersey Location in the United States
- Coordinates: 40.960286°N 74.713332°W
- Country: United States
- State: New Jersey
- County: Sussex
- Formed: February 5, 1798
- Incorporated: February 21, 1798
- Named after: Byram family

Government
  - Type: Faulkner Act Council-Manager
  - Body: Township Council
  - Mayor: Alexander Rubenstein (term ends December 31, 2026)
  - Manager: Joseph Sabatini
  - Municipal clerk: Cindy Church

Area
  - Total: 22.72 sq mi (58.84 km^{2})
  - Land: 21.53 sq mi (55.76 km^{2})
  - Water: 1.19 sq mi (3.07 km^{2}) 5.22%
  - Rank: 121st of 565 in state 11th of 24 in county
- Elevation: 1,053 ft (321 m)

Population (2020)
  - Total: 8,028
  - Estimate (2023): 8,152
  - Rank: 292nd of 565 in state 7th of 24 in county
  - Density: 372.9/sq mi (144.0/km^{2})
  - Rank: 461st of 565 in state 11th of 24 in county
- Time zone: UTC−05:00 (Eastern (EST))
  - Summer (DST): UTC−04:00 (Eastern (EDT))
- ZIP Code: 07871 – Andover
- Area codes: 862/973
- FIPS code: 3403709160
- GNIS feature ID: 0882263
- Website: www.byramtwp.org

Byram Township is a township in Sussex County, in the U.S. state of New Jersey. As of the 2020 United States census, the township's population was 8,028, a decrease of 322 (−3.9%) from the 2010 census count of 8,350, which in turn reflected an increase of 96 (+1.2%) from the 8,254 counted in the 2000 census.

The municipality is known as the "Township of Lakes", as there are roughly two dozen lakes and ponds within its borders.

== History ==
Byram Township was created by an act by the New Jersey General Assembly on February 5, 1798, from portions of the now-defunct Newton Township, and was incorporated on February 21, 1798, as one of New Jersey's initial group of 104 townships. The township was named for the Byram family, who were early settlers in the area. Patriarch Jephthah Byram and his family, were believed to have emigrated to the area after the American Revolutionary War. Before being named Byram, the community had been called Lockwood, and the Lockwood Tavern continued to hold this original name until its demolition in 2015. In 1829, a section of Green Township was incorporated into the township. Portions of the township have been taken to form Sparta township (April 14, 1845), Brooklyn borough (March 24, 1898, now called Hopatcong) and Stanhope borough (March 24, 1904).

There are many historical sites located in Byram. The town's oldest structure, the 1802 Leport House, stands by the Byram General Store on Sparta-Stanhope Road. The Lockwood Cemetery, established around 1818, consists of about 30 gravestones and the remnants of a church's foundation. The 1853 Roseville Schoolhouse was moved from its original location on Lackawanna Drive to Mansfield Drive, reopening in September 1986 as the Roseville Schoolhouse Museum.

In 1911, the Lackawanna Cut-Off rail line opened through Byram Township, with a station stop near the current Forest Lakes neighborhood. The Cut-Off was part of the Delaware, Lackawanna and Western Railroad's mainline from Hoboken, New Jersey to Buffalo, New York. The railroad was important in providing transportation for mines in Northern Jersey. It passes through Byram for a long distance. It runs mainly along Roseville, but as Roseville veers north, the tracks continue west. The line was abandoned in 1980 and the tracks were removed four years later. There is a proposal to reactivate passenger service via NJ Transit in the future, with work underway at the Roseville Tunnel.

In 2001, then-mayor Richard Bowe called for an investigation of weather forecasters due to a snowstorm that had been forecast but never materialized, arguing that forecasters should be held responsible for the "excessive overtime costs" that the township experienced and for losses of local businesses shut in advance of the predicted snowfall.

=== Mining ===
Byram Township had a very large mining industry in the past. The largest mine, The Roseville Mine, is located on the current Roseville Road. The mine is in a quadrilateral plot of land, with the southwestern corner created by Roseville Road and Amity Road. The southeastern corner is created by an intersection between Roseville Road and the Lackawanna Cut-off. The Roseville Mine was first excavated in the early 1850s. It was well worked during its life, with production in 1880 alone documented as 67,000 tons of ore. Most of the work was done via a large open cut. This cut as it exists today, is water-filled, with vertical walls as much as 80 to 90 feet (24 to 27 m) high. The Charlotte Uranium mine extracted uranium from the rocks of southwestern Byram. The mine closed in the 1950s, but many remnants are still visible.

== Geography ==
According to the United States Census Bureau, the township had a total area of 22.72 square miles (58.84 km^{2}), including 21.53 square miles (55.76 km^{2}) of land and 1.19 square miles (3.07 km^{2}) of water (5.22%). It is divided into several sections. They include the neighborhoods of Forest West, East and West Brookwood, Forest Lakes, Lackawanna, Cranberry Lake, and the Lake Mohawk area.

The township is known as the "Township of Lakes" because of the community's nearly two dozen lakes and ponds.

A wooded exclave owned by the State of New Jersey and covering 33 acres (13 ha) is located on Lake Musconetcong adjoining Hopatcong and Stanhope, 1 mile (1.6 km) away from the remainder of the township.

Byram Center (with a 2020 Census population of 2,232) is an unincorporated community and census-designated place (CDP) located within Byram Township. Lake Mohawk (with 1,824 out of the CDP's total 2010 Census population of 9,916 in the township) is a CDP split between Byram Township and Sparta Township.

Other unincorporated communities, localities and place names located partially or completely within the township include Brookwood East, Brookwood West, Cage Hill, Cranberry Lake, Forest Lakes, Jefferson Lake, Lake Lackawanna, Lockwood, Panther Pond, Roseville, Stag Pond, Tomahawk Lane, Waterloo, Wolf Lake and Wrights Pond.

Streams

- Lubbers Run runs through the township, intersecting Mansfield Drive. The run is monitored monthly by the Byram Intermediate School's Environmental Club.
- Punkhorn Creek runs through the township, flowing southwest from Lake Bottom, on the north side of and parallel with Amity Road, to Roseville Pond.

Residents of Byram are served by adjacent post offices in Stanhope, Andover Township and Sparta Township.

The township borders the municipalities of Andover Township, Green Township, Hopatcong, Sparta Township and Stanhope in Sussex County; Mount Olive Township in Morris County; and Allamuchy Township in Warren County.

== Demographics ==
Historical population
Census	Pop.	Note	%±
1810	591		—
1820	672		13.7%
1830	958		42.6%
1840	1,153		20.4%
1850	1,340	*	16.2%
1860	1,202		−10.3%
1870	1,332		10.8%
1880	1,406		5.6%
1890	1,380		−1.8%
1900	1,235	*	−10.5%
1910	1,055	*	−14.6%
1920	409		−61.2%
1930	245		−40.1%
1940	373		52.2%
1950	761		104.0%
1960	1,616		112.4%
1970	4,592		184.2%
1980	7,502		63.4%
1990	8,048		7.3%
2000	8,254		2.6%
2010	8,350		1.2%
2020	8,028		−3.9%
2023 (est.)	8,152		1.5%
Population sources: 1810–1920 1840 1850–1870; 1850 1870 1880–1890; 1890–1910 1910–1930; 1940–2000 2000; 2010 2020 * = Lost territory in previous decade.

=== 2010 census ===
The 2010 United States census counted 8,350 people, 2,926 households, and 2,361 families in the township. The population density was 396.2 per square mile (153.0/km^{2}). There were 3,207 housing units at an average density of 152.2 per square mile (58.8/km^{2}). The racial makeup was 94.35% (7,878) White, 1.47% (123) Black or African American, 0.12% (10) Native American, 2.14% (179) Asian, 0.01% (1) Pacific Islander, 0.62% (52) from other races, and 1.28% (107) from two or more races. Hispanic or Latino of any race were 4.99% (417) of the population.

Of the 2,926 households, 37.4% had children under the age of 18; 69.3% were married couples living together; 8.0% had a female householder with no husband present and 19.3% were non-families. Of all households, 14.9% were made up of individuals and 4.5% had someone living alone who was 65 years of age or older. The average household size was 2.85 and the average family size was 3.19.

25.7% of the population were under the age of 18, 7.1% from 18 to 24, 24.3% from 25 to 44, 32.8% from 45 to 64, and 10.1% who were 65 years of age or older. The median age was 41.2 years. For every 100 females, the population had 101.1 males. For every 100 females ages 18 and older there were 99.1 males.

The Census Bureau's 2006–2010 American Community Survey showed that (in 2010 inflation-adjusted dollars) median household income was $103,519 (with a margin of error of +/− $5,758) and the median family income was $113,555 (+/− $12,281). Males had a median income of $78,347 (+/− $7,621) versus $54,504 (+/− $5,146) for females. The per capita income for the borough was $43,160 (+/− $3,087). About 0.8% of families and 1.7% of the population were below the poverty line, including 2.5% of those under age 18 and 2.6% of those age 65 or over.

=== 2000 census ===
As of the 2000 United States census there were 8,254 people, 2,833 households, and 2,317 families residing in the township. The population density was 391.8 inhabitants per square mile (151.3/km^{2}). There were 3,078 housing units at an average density of 146.1 per square mile (56.4/km^{2}). The racial makeup of the township was 95.77% White, 0.97% African American, 0.06% Native American, 1.41% Asian, 0.06% Pacific Islander, 0.64% from other races, and 1.09% from two or more races. Hispanic or Latino of any race were 2.94% of the population.

There were 2,833 households, out of which 43.7% had children under the age of 18 living with them, 72.9% were married couples living together, 6.2% had a female householder with no husband present, and 18.2% were non-families. 13.9% of all households were made up of individuals, and 3.9% had someone living alone who was 65 years of age or older. The average household size was 2.91 and the average family size was 3.24.

In the township the population was spread out, with 28.8% under the age of 18, 5.8% from 18 to 24, 32.4% from 25 to 44, 26.9% from 45 to 64, and 6.1% who were 65 years of age or older. The median age was 36 years. For every 100 females, there were 98.6 males. For every 100 females age 18 and over, there were 98.4 males.

The median income for a household in the township was $81,532, and the median income for a family was $89,500. Males had a median income of $59,722 versus $40,396 for females. The per capita income for the township was $30,710. About 0.9% of families and 1.7% of the population were below the poverty line, including 1.0% of those under age 18 and 1.1% of those age 65 or over.

== Parks and recreation ==
=== Trails and hiking ===
Byram Township is known as the "Gateway to New Jersey Trails".

The Sussex Branch Trail extends 21.2 miles (34.1 km) from Netcong to Branchville, following the route of the old Sussex Railroad, a branch of the Erie Lackawanna Railway, which was in service under various ownerships from 1848 to 1966. Trail users can explore the route once used by steam locomotives and long freight trains.

=== Parks ===
The township has several municipal parks:

- C.O. Johnson Park, named after former Byram mayor, Carl O. Johnson (Democrat). Carl was the mayor of Byram for 25 years. This park has a football field, baseball field, tennis court, skateboard park, and a track for walking. It has restrooms, a refreshment/snack area, and a picnic area with five tables with attached benches and two handicapped-accessible tables.
- Riverside Park is at the intersection of River Road and Waterloo Road in Byram Township. Opened in late summer 2001, it is Byram's newest park. The park has the Musconetcong River running right behind it and features walking paths, fishing and canoeing. The park has a playground, picnic tables, a gazebo and basketball courts.
- Tomahawk Park is a small park located on Tomahawk Trail in Byram Township. It is across from Tomahawk Lake.
- Parts of Allamuchy Mountain State Park are in the township, with the park accessible via state trails.
- Neil Gylling Memorial Park has two softball fields. A soccer field is also set up between the softball fields during the fall season. There are also two tennis courts. This is the traditional location for Byram Day (the celebration was hosted by Waterloo Village before being moved to Neil Gylling Memorial Park) which is celebrated the 2nd Saturday in September of every year.
- Brookwood Park is a small park that contains a basketball court in East Brookwood.

Wild West City is a Dodge City-styled theme park located on County Route 607 (Lackawanna Drive)

==== Waterloo Village ====
Waterloo Village used to exhibit many time periods from a 400-year-old Lenape (Delaware) Native American village to a bustling port along the once prosperous Morris Canal. The early 19th-century village contained a working mill with gristmills and sawmills, a general store, a blacksmith shop and restored houses. Classical and popular music programs are available to the public during the summer months. Waterloo Village was shut down to preserve the artifacts inside, though plans have been made to restore the buildings on the site.

==== Cranberry Lake ====
Cranberry Lake is a man-made lake, originally created in 1830 as a reservoir for the Morris Canal. Cranberry Lake is bordered on the east by U.S. Route 206 and the Sussex Branch Trail. The local community is bordered on the north and south by Allamuchy Mountain State Park. The Cranberry Lake footbridge, one of the oldest pedestrian footbridges in NJ transverses the lake from east to west and connects the west shore of the community with the Sussex Branch Trail.

== Government ==
=== Local government ===
The Township of Byram is chartered under the Faulkner Act Council-Manager plan. The township is one of 42 municipalities (of the 564) statewide that use this form of government. The governing body is comprised of the Mayor and the five-member Township Council. All officials are elected on an at-large basis in non-partisan elections for four-year terms of office on a staggered basis, with either two seats (including the mayoral seat) or three seats up for election in odd-numbered years as part of the November general election, with terms beginning on January 1. In August 2010, the township became the first in the state to shift its non-partisan elections from May to November as part of an effort to raise turnout and cut costs by combining the municipal election with the November general election; the first election under the new cycle took place in November 2011.

As of 2024, the Mayor of Byram Township is Alexander Rubenstein, whose term of office ends on December 31, 2025. Members of the Byram Township Council are Lisa A. "Cris" Franco (2027), John M. "Jack" Gallagher Jr. (2027), Richard Proctor (2027) and Harvey S. Roseff (2025).

=== Federal, state, and county representation ===
Byram Township is located in the 7th Congressional District and is part of New Jersey's 24th state legislative district.

For the 119th United States Congress, New Jersey's 7th congressional district is represented by Thomas Kean Jr. (R, Westfield). New Jersey is represented in the United States Senate by Democrats Cory Booker (Newark, term ends 2027) and Andy Kim (Moorestown, term ends 2031).

For the 2026–2027 session, the 24th legislative district of the New Jersey Legislature is represented in the State Senate by Parker Space (R, Wantage Township) and in the General Assembly by Dawn Fantasia (R, Franklin) and Mike Inganamort (R, Chester Township).

Sussex County is governed by a Board of County Commissioners whose five members are elected at-large in partisan elections on a staggered basis, with either one or two seats coming up for election each year. At an annual reorganization meeting held in the beginning of January, the board selects a Commissioner Director and Deputy Director from among its members, with day-to-day supervision of the operation of the county delegated to a County Administrator. As of 2025, Sussex County's Commissioners are Director Jill Space (R, Wantage Township, 2025), Deputy Director Chris Carney (R, Frankford Township, 2027), Jack DeGroot (R, Sussex, 2026), William Hayden (I, Branchville, 2025) and Alan Henderson (R, Lafayette Township, 2027).

Constitutional officers elected on a countywide basis are Clerk Jeffrey M. Parrott (R, Wantage Township, 2026), Sheriff Michael F. Strada (R, Hampton Township, 2025) and Surrogate Gary R. Chiusano (R, Frankford Township, 2028).

=== Politics ===
As of March 2011, there were a total of 5,805 registered voters in Byram Township, of which 1,128 (19.4% vs. 16.5% countywide) were registered as Democrats, 1,957 (33.7% vs. 39.3%) were registered as Republicans and 2,714 (46.8% vs. 44.1%) were registered as Unaffiliated. There were 6 voters registered as Libertarians or Greens. Among the township's 2010 Census population, 69.5% (vs. 65.8% in Sussex County) were registered to vote, including 93.6% of those ages 18 and over (vs. 86.5% countywide).

Gubernatorial election results for Byram Township
Year	Republican		Democratic		Third party(ies)	
Year	No.	%	No.	%	No.	%
2025	2,310	57.88%	1,657	41.52%	24	0.60%
2021	2,233	65.62%	1,124	33.03%	46	1.35%
2017	1,666	59.27%	1,014	36.07%	131	4.66%
2013	1,948	70.02%	729	26.20%	105	3.77%
2009	1,971	65.55%	715	23.78%	321	10.68%
2005	1,593	60.78%	880	33.57%	148	5.65%

In the 2012 presidential election, Republican Mitt Romney received 2,373 votes (60.5% vs. 59.4% countywide), ahead of Democrat Barack Obama with 1,464 votes (37.3% vs. 38.2%) and other candidates with 78 votes (2.0% vs. 2.1%), among the 3,923 ballots cast by the township's 5,883 registered voters, for a turnout of 66.7% (vs. 68.3% in Sussex County). In the 2008 presidential election, Republican John McCain received 2,693 votes (59.6% vs. 59.2% countywide), ahead of Democrat Barack Obama with 1,728 votes (38.3% vs. 38.7%) and other candidates with 76 votes (1.7% vs. 1.5%), among the 4,517 ballots cast by the township's 5,735 registered voters, for a turnout of 78.8% (vs. 76.9% in Sussex County). In the 2004 presidential election, Republican George W. Bush received 2,727 votes (62.6% vs. 63.9% countywide), ahead of Democrat John Kerry with 1,558 votes (35.8% vs. 34.4%) and other candidates with 56 votes (1.3% vs. 1.3%), among the 4,353 ballots cast by the township's 5,371 registered voters, for a turnout of 81.0% (vs. 77.7% in the whole county).

United States presidential election results for Byram Township 2024 2020 2016 2012 2008 2004
Year	Republican		Democratic		Third party(ies)	
Year	No.	%	No.	%	No.	%
2024	3,047	59.96%	1,946	38.29%	89	1.75%
2020	3,036	57.83%	2,099	39.98%	115	2.19%
2016	2,830	62.56%	1,516	33.51%	178	3.93%
2012	2,373	60.61%	1,464	37.39%	78	1.99%
2008	2,693	59.88%	1,728	38.43%	76	1.69%
2004	2,727	62.82%	1,558	35.89%	56	1.29%

In the 2013 gubernatorial election, Republican Chris Christie received 70.0% of the vote (1,948 cast), ahead of Democrat Barbara Buono with 26.2% (729 votes), and other candidates with 3.8% (105 votes), among the 2,814 ballots cast by the township's 5,975 registered voters (32 ballots were spoiled), for a turnout of 47.1%. In the 2009 gubernatorial election, Republican Chris Christie received 1,971 votes (65.4% vs. 63.3% countywide), ahead of Democrat Jon Corzine with 715 votes (23.7% vs. 25.7%), Independent Chris Daggett with 286 votes (9.5% vs. 9.1%) and other candidates with 35 votes (1.2% vs. 1.3%), among the 3,016 ballots cast by the township's 5,708 registered voters, yielding a 52.8% turnout (vs. 52.3% in the county).

United States Senate election results for Byram Township1
Year	Republican		Democratic		Third party(ies)	
Year	No.	%	No.	%	No.	%
2024	2,912	58.88%	1,884	38.09%	150	3.03%
2018	2,267	61.37%	1,242	33.62%	185	5.01%
2012	2,229	58.44%	1,439	37.73%	146	3.83%
2006	1,608	61.77%	898	34.50%	97	3.73%

United States Senate election results for Byram Township2
Year	Republican		Democratic		Third party(ies)	
Year	No.	%	No.	%	No.	%
2020	2,956	57.50%	2,033	39.54%	152	2.96%
2014	1,308	63.34%	691	33.46%	66	3.20%
2013	1,156	64.87%	607	34.06%	19	1.07%
2008	2,490	57.14%	1,683	38.62%	185	4.25%

== Education ==
The Byram Township School District serves public school students in pre-kindergarten through eighth grade. As of the 2022–23 school year, the district, comprised of two schools, had an enrollment of 837 students and 74.0 classroom teachers (on an FTE basis), for a student–teacher ratio of 11.3:1. Schools in the district (with 2022–23 enrollment data from the National Center for Education Statistics) are Byram Lakes Elementary School with 453 students in grades PreK-4 and Byram Intermediate School with 380 students in grades 5-8.

For public school students in ninth through twelfth grades, the township shares Lenape Valley Regional High School, which also serves Netcong in Morris County and the Sussex County community of Stanhope. As of the 2022–23 school year, the high school had an enrollment of 667 students and 58.3 classroom teachers (on an FTE basis), for a student–teacher ratio of 11.5:1.

The Consolidated School, a former public school building that had previously been used by the school district for students in Kindergarten through second grade, has been leased to Celebrate the Children, a private school that serves students with special needs.

Private schools in the area include Reverend Brown in Sparta for grades K–8 and Pope John XXIII Regional High School, the county's only private high school, which operate under the auspices of the Roman Catholic Diocese of Paterson. Hilltop Country Day School, which also serves K–8, also has students from Byram. Byram has students in various private high schools, but all but one school are located outside of Sussex County.

== Transportation ==
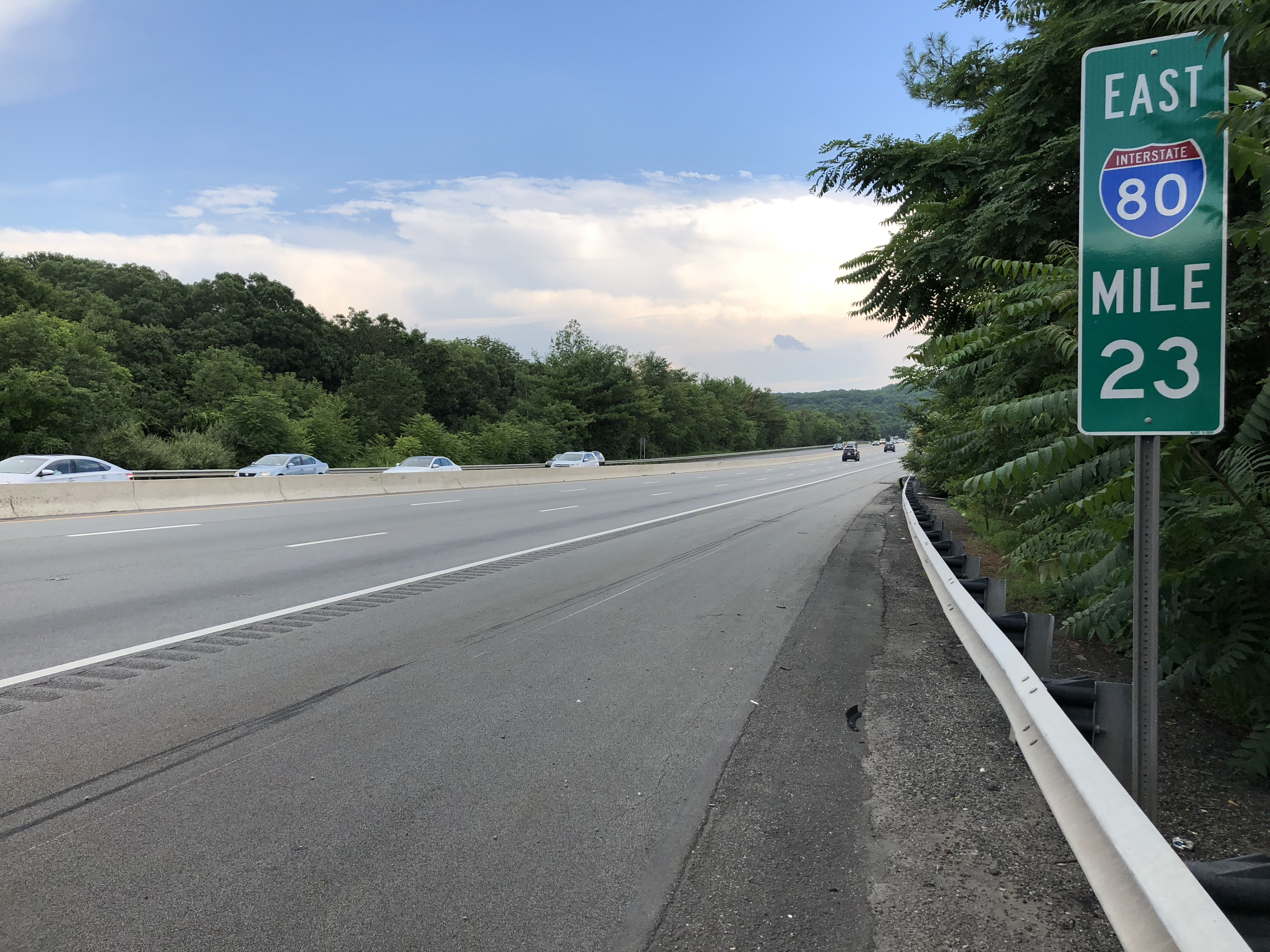
Interstate 80 eastbound in Byram Township

=== Roads and highways ===
As of May 2010, the township had a total of 62.35 miles (100.34 km) of roadways, of which 45.40 miles (73.06 km) were maintained by the municipality, 12.34 miles (19.86 km) by Sussex County and 4.61 miles (7.42 km) by the New Jersey Department of Transportation.

The township is bisected by U.S. Route 206. A small portion of Interstate 80 passes through the southern tip of Byram Township but without any interchanges; the closest exit is Exit 25 in bordering Mount Olive Township.

=== Public transportation ===
Lakeland Bus Lines provides service operating along Interstate 80 between Newton, New Jersey and the Port Authority Bus Terminal in Midtown Manhattan.

== Notable people ==
People who were born in, residents of, or otherwise closely associated with Byram Township include:

- Rob Freeman (born 1981), of the group Hidden in Plain View
- Daniela Gioseffi (born 1941), poet, novelist and performer who won the American Book Award in 1990
- Michael John Hoban (1853–1926), prelate of the Roman Catholic Church who served as Bishop of Scranton from 1899 until his death
- Alexia Lacatena (born 2002), pitcher who is a member of the Italy women's national softball team and was selected to compete in the 2020 Summer Olympics
- Robert Leckie (1920–2001), United States Marine and author of books on United States military history, sports, fiction, autobiographies and children's books
- Karen Ann Quinlan (1954–1985), important figure in the history of the right to die controversy in the United States
- Adam Riggs (born 1972), former professional baseball first baseman
- Tom Valenti (1959–2026), chef
