= Allamuchy Mountain State Park =

State park in New Jersey, United States

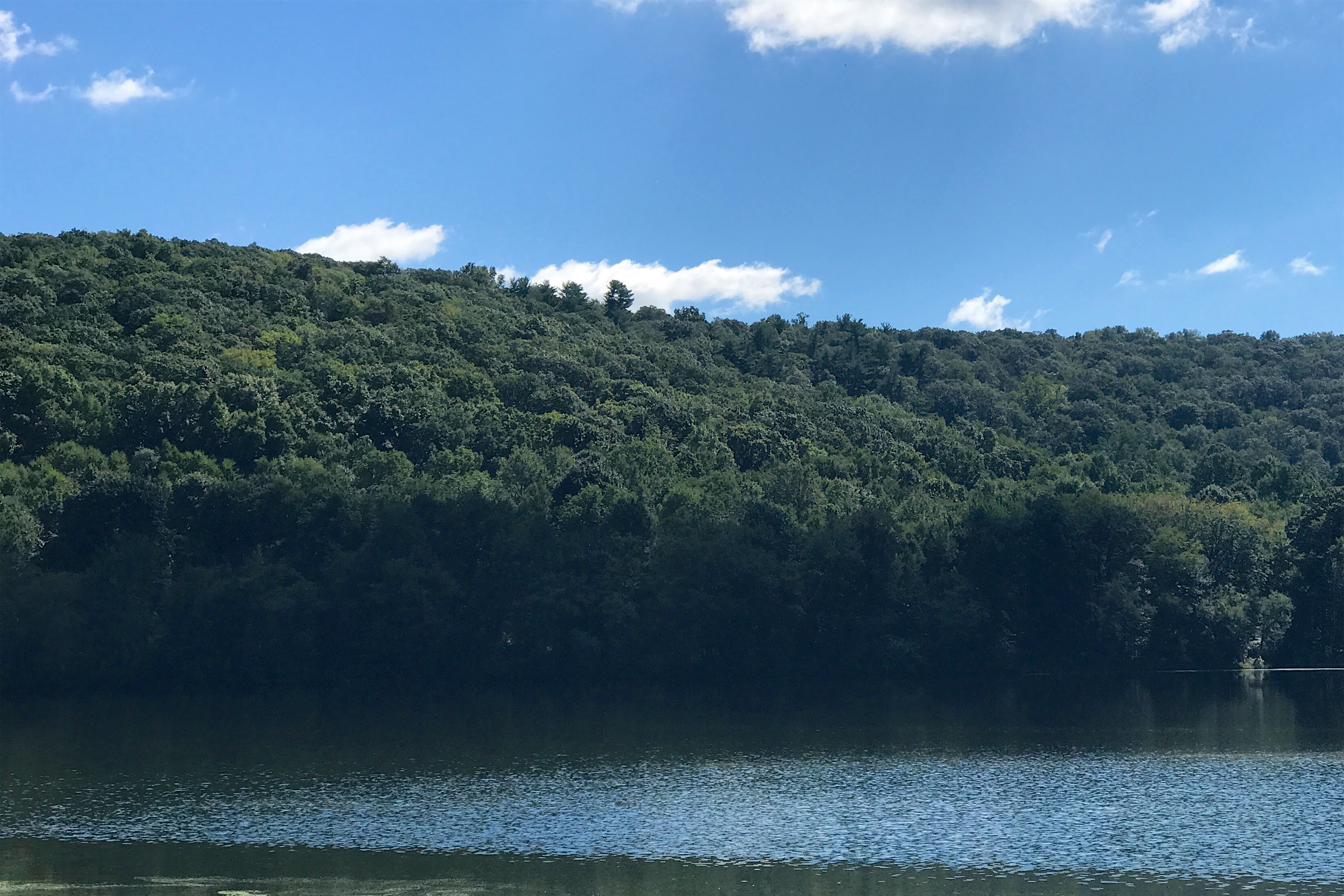
- Allamuchy Mountain and Pond

- Location within Sussex County, New Jersey Location within Warren County, New Jersey Location within New Jersey Location within the United States
- Interactive map of Allamuchy Mountain State Park
- Location: Allamuchy Township and Byram Township, New Jersey, United States
- Coordinates: 40°55′16″N 74°46′56″W
- Area: 9,092 acres (36.79 km^{2})
- Established: 1966
- Website: Official website

Allamuchy Mountain State Park is located in Allamuchy Township and Byram Township in the Allamuchy Mountain region of New Jersey. The park is operated and maintained by the New Jersey Division of Parks and Forestry. There are more than 20 miles (32 km) of unmarked trails in the northern section of Allamuchy, and 14 miles (23 km) of marked multi-use trails.

The park is in the Northeastern coastal forests ecoregion. The 2,440 acres (9.9 km^{2}) of mixed oak and hardwood forests and maintained fields of this natural area display various stages of succession. It is situated on the Musconetcong River.

== History ==
The Rutherfurd-Stuyvesant Estate dates back to the 1700s and featured a large mansion and many outbuildings. By the mid 20th century, the mansion had burned down and the remaining buildings were in very poor condition. In the 1960s, the estate was purchased by the State to build route 80, which divided sections of the estate with an eight-lane highway. In the 1970s, the Allamuchy Mountain land became part of Allamuchy Mountain State Park. Tranquillity Farms, on the other side of the highway, remains a privately operated commercial farm.

Locally, the ruins of the Rutherfurd-Stuyvesant Estate have become known as "Profanity House" because many of the buildings and ruins have been vandalized and covered in explicit and graphic graffiti. In recent years, the estate has suffered from arson damage.

== Attractions ==
=== Waterloo Village ===
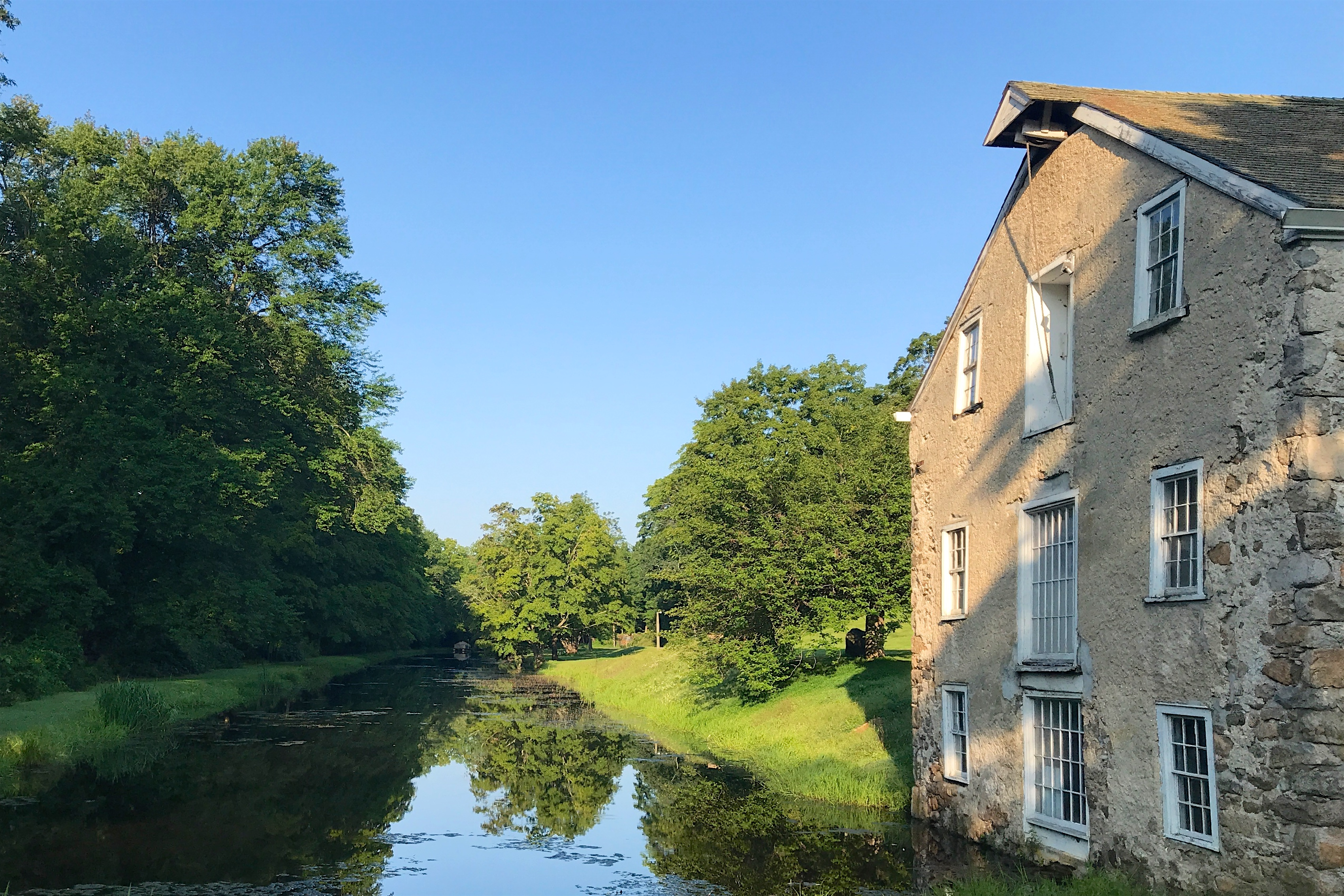
The Morris Canal passing by Smith's General Store in Waterloo Village.

Waterloo Village has exhibits from many different time periods from a 400-year-old Lenape (Delaware) Native American village to a port along the once prosperous Morris Canal. The early 19th-century village contains a working mill with gristmills and sawmills, a general store, a blacksmith shop and restored houses.

=== Sussex Branch Trail ===
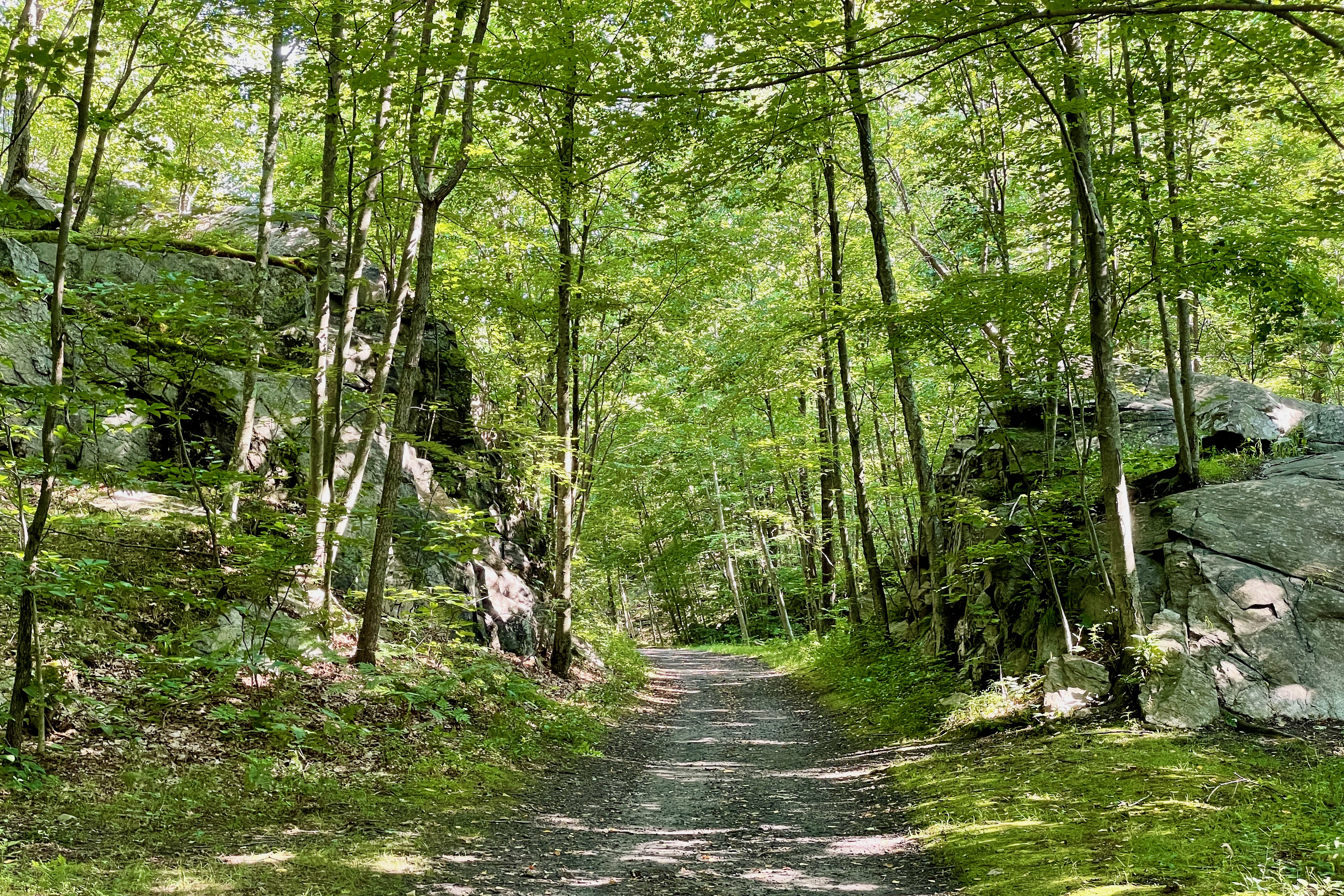
Sussex Branch Trail passing through a rock cut

The Sussex Branch Trail, a rail trail on the former Sussex Railroad, has a trail head on Waterloo Road. It travels 3 miles (4.8 km) to Cranberry Lake.

== See also ==
- Rutherfurd Hall
