= Geraldine R. Dodge Poetry Festival =

Biennial poetry festival in North America

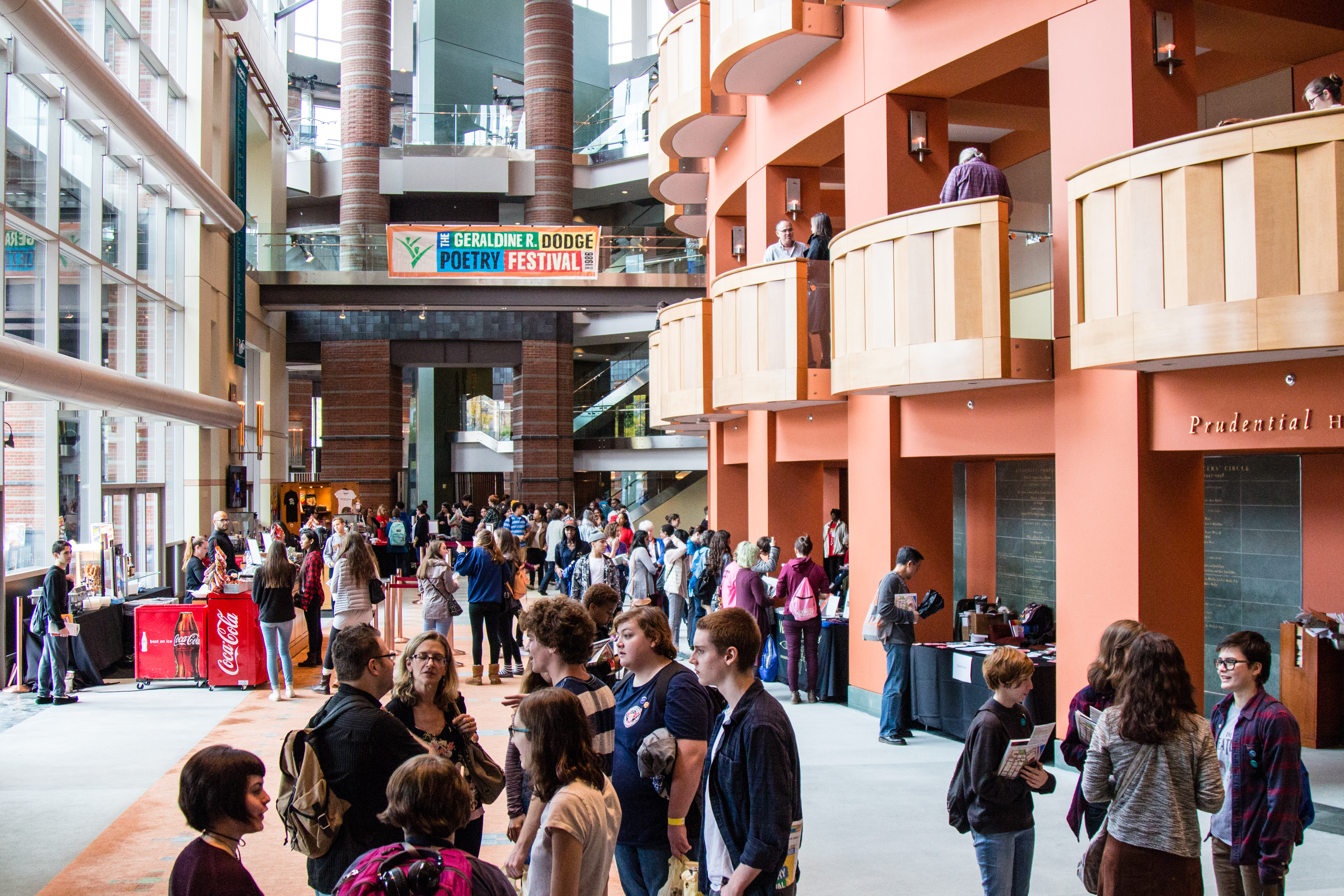
- 16th edition in Newark, New Jersey
- Status: active
- Frequency: Biennial: Even-Numbered Years
- Locations: Waterloo Village, NJ (original); Newark NJ's Downtown Arts District (since 2010)
- Inaugurated: 1986
- Most recent: October 17, 2024—October 19, 2024
- Next event: October 15, 2026—October 17, 2026
- Patron: Geraldine R. Dodge Foundation
- Website: www.dodgepoetry.org

The biennial Geraldine R. Dodge Poetry Festival is the largest poetry event in North America. The 16th edition, and 30th anniversary, of the biannual event took place in Newark, New Jersey, October 20–23, 2016. The most recent festival took place in Newark, 17--19 October 2024.

== Background ==
The four-day celebration of poetry has been called “poetry heaven” by the 1995–1997 US Poet Laureate Robert Hass, “a new Woodstock” by the Christian Science Monitor, and “Wordstock” by The New York Times. The festival has been sponsored by the Geraldine R. Dodge Foundation in even-numbered years since 1986. The festival immerses audiences and more than five dozen internationally acclaimed poets in discussions, readings, and conversations focusing on poetry. Events are held all day and evening in performance venues accommodating anywhere from 100 to over 2,000 people. Each day, ten or more separate stages simultaneously offer different activities. The 13th biennial festival took place in Newark, New Jersey at NJPAC, Newark Symphony Hall, and other venues around the city. The 14th festival took place in the city October 11–14, 2012.

The 11th festival, held from September 28 through October 1, 2006, at Waterloo Village in Stanhope, New Jersey, attracted nearly 17,000 people. The 12th festival took place from September 25 to 28, 2008. Soon after, on January 13, 2009, the Foundation announced that financial challenges were forcing the Foundation "to take a different approach to our poetry activities in 2009 and 2010." Specifically, and most importantly, the Foundation announced that it would be unable to produce a Poetry Festival in September 2010 on the scale of past Festivals. The announcement noted that "We will maintain much of our work with New Jersey teachers of poetry this spring, and we will actually expand our efforts to make the audio and video archives of past Festivals readily available via YouTube and other means for all who want to enjoy them. Yet we must at least take a cycle off from the biennial Festival as you have known it and, depending on how things turn out, we may need to 'reinvent' the Festival on either a more affordable scale or in a more affordable venue. (Unfortunately, over the last three Festivals, the production costs have more than doubled, and a mere 20% of the Festival budget went toward hiring the poets at the very center of the event.)"

An essential component of each festival is a series of special programs for high school students and for teachers at all levels, elementary through college. More than 4,500 students and 2,000 teachers from throughout the country participate in conversations and readings designed specifically for them during the first two days of the festival.

The Geraldine R. Dodge Poetry Festival has been extensively featured in four PBS television series with Bill Moyers. The acclaimed eight-part The Language of Life series was filmed at the 1994 Festival providing a look at the overall activities of the Festival and in-depth conversations with the featured poets. More recently, Fooling With Words offered television audiences a front-row seat at the 1998 Festival.
