= Byram Center, New Jersey =

Populated place in Sussex County, New Jersey, US

- Census-designated place
- Location in Sussex County Location in New Jersey Location in the United States
- Coordinates: 40.93989°N 74.717073°W
- Country: United States
- State: New Jersey
- County: Sussex
- Township: Byram

Area
  - Total: 2.88 sq mi (7.45 km^{2})
  - Land: 2.86 sq mi (7.41 km^{2})
  - Water: 0.012 sq mi (0.03 km^{2}) 0.00%
- Elevation: 850 ft (260 m)

Population (2020)
  - Total: 2,232
  - Density: 779.9/sq mi (301.12/km^{2})
- Time zone: UTC−05:00 (Eastern (EST))
  - Summer (DST): UTC−04:00 (Eastern (EDT))
- Area codes: 862/973
- FIPS code: 34-09170
- GNIS feature ID: 02583979

Byram Center is an unincorporated community and census-designated place (CDP) located in Byram Township, in Sussex County, in the U.S. state of New Jersey. As of the 2020 census, Byram Center had a population of 2,232.

== Geography ==
According to the United States Census Bureau, Byram Center had a total area of 1.117 square miles (2.894 km^{2}), all of which was land.

== Demographics ==
Historical population
Census	Pop.	Note	%±
2010	90		—
2020	2,232		2,380.0%
Population sources: 2010 2020

Byram Center first appeared as a census designated place in the 2010 U.S. census.

=== Racial and ethnic composition ===
Byram Center CDP, New Jersey – Racial and ethnic composition Note: the US Census treats Hispanic/Latino as an ethnic category. This table excludes Latinos from the racial categories and assigns them to a separate category. Hispanics/Latinos may be of any race.
Race / Ethnicity (NH = Non-Hispanic)	Pop 2010	Pop 2020	% 2010	% 2020
White alone (NH)	84	1,888	93.33%	84.59%
Black or African American alone (NH)	0	45	0.00%	2.02%
Native American or Alaska Native alone (NH)	0	0	0.00%	0.00%
Asian alone (NH)	0	41	0.00%	1.84%
Native Hawaiian or Pacific Islander alone (NH)	0	0	0.00%	0.00%
Other race alone (NH)	1	19	1.11%	0.85%
Mixed race or Multiracial (NH)	2	62	2.22%	2.78%
Hispanic or Latino (any race)	3	177	3.33%	7.93%
Total	90	2,232	100.00%	100.00%

=== 2020 census ===
As of the 2020 census, Byram Center had a population of 2,232. The median age was 42.6 years. 20.6% of residents were under the age of 18 and 16.5% of residents were 65 years of age or older. For every 100 females there were 99.8 males, and for every 100 females age 18 and over there were 99.3 males age 18 and over.

91.6% of residents lived in urban areas, while 8.4% lived in rural areas.

There were 790 households in Byram Center, of which 31.4% had children under the age of 18 living in them. Of all households, 63.8% were married-couple households, 12.2% were households with a male householder and no spouse or partner present, and 19.5% were households with a female householder and no spouse or partner present. About 16.9% of all households were made up of individuals and 8.8% had someone living alone who was 65 years of age or older.

There were 846 housing units, of which 6.6% were vacant. The homeowner vacancy rate was 1.9% and the rental vacancy rate was 13.5%.

=== 2010 census ===
The 2010 United States census counted 90 people, 34 households, and 23 families in the CDP. The population density was 80.5 per square mile (31.1/km^{2}). There were 40 housing units at an average density of 35.8 per square mile (13.8/km^{2}). The racial makeup was 96.67% (87) White, 0.00% (0) Black or African American, 0.00% (0) Native American, 0.00% (0) Asian, 0.00% (0) Pacific Islander, 1.11% (1) from other races, and 2.22% (2) from two or more races. Hispanic or Latino of any race were 3.33% (3) of the population.

Of the 34 households, 23.5% had children under the age of 18; 58.8% were married couples living together; 5.9% had a female householder with no husband present and 32.4% were non-families. Of all households, 26.5% were made up of individuals and 5.9% had someone living alone who was 65 years of age or older. The average household size was 2.65 and the average family size was 3.22.

20.0% of the population were under the age of 18, 8.9% from 18 to 24, 23.3% from 25 to 44, 40.0% from 45 to 64, and 7.8% who were 65 years of age or older. The median age was 44.0 years. For every 100 females, the population had 104.5 males. For every 100 females ages 18 and older there were 111.8 males.
