= Alalis =

Titular see of Phoenicia

Alalis was a titular see of Phoenicia (Palmyra), whose episcopal list is known from 325 to 451. It was located near the Euphrates, and was a suffragan of Damascus.
