= Chris Daggett =

American businessman and public official

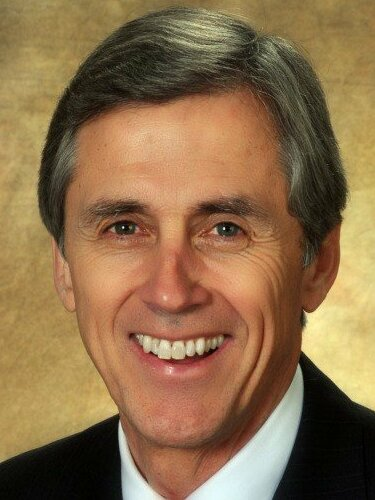

Commissioner of the New Jersey Department of Environmental Protection
- In office March 14, 1989 – December 31, 1989; Acting: September 8, 1988 – March 14, 1989
- Governor: Thomas Kean
- Preceded by: Richard T. Dewling
- Succeeded by: Judith A. Yaskin

Personal details
- Born: Christopher Jarvis Daggett; March 7, 1950 (age 76) Orange, New Jersey, U.S.
- Party: Independent
- Spouse: Bea Horvath Daggett
- Education: University of North Carolina, B.A. University of Massachusetts Amherst, Ed.D.

Christopher Jarvis Daggett (born March 7, 1950) is an American businessman who is the president and CEO of the Geraldine R. Dodge Foundation, one of the largest foundations in New Jersey. A former regional administrator of the United States Environmental Protection Agency and Commissioner of the New Jersey Department of Environmental Protection, he ran as an independent candidate for Governor of New Jersey in 2009, garnering 5.8% of the vote.

== Biography ==
Daggett was born in Orange, New Jersey and was raised in Linwood. He later moved to Bernards Township and attended Ridge High School. He graduated from the University of North Carolina and went on to the University of Massachusetts Amherst, where he received a Doctor of Education degree in 1977.

Daggett returned to New Jersey and worked on the 1977 gubernatorial campaign of Republican Party candidate Raymond Bateman against the incumbent Brendan Byrne. In 1981, he joined the campaign of Republican gubernatorial candidate Thomas Kean. When Kean was elected governor, Daggett served as deputy chief of staff specializing in education policy. In 1984, Daggett was named regional administrator of the United States Environmental Protection Agency for Region 2, which includes New York, New Jersey, Puerto Rico and the U.S. Virgin Islands. He was recommended for the position by Governor Kean.

Daggett rejoined the Kean administration in 1988, when he was appointed acting Commissioner of the New Jersey Department of Environmental Protection. He was also nominated by Kean to be the permanent Commissioner, but his nomination was delayed by an ethics investigation over his attendance at a fundraiser for George H. W. Bush hosted by Republican National Finance Committee chairman Lawrence E. Bathgate II, an attorney for Ciba-Geigy, under indictment for dumping hazardous waste at its facility in Ocean County. Daggett said he did nothing wrong in attending the fundraiser, and his nomination was finally cleared by the New Jersey Senate in February 1989.

Daggett served until the end of 1989, when he became a partner at William E. Simon & Sons, a Morristown investment firm founded by William E. Simon. He continued to work on environmental issues with various governors of New Jersey. He was appointed by Governor Jon Corzine as chairman of the New Jersey Department of Environmental Protection Permit Efficiency Task Force.

Shortly after his gubernatorial campaign ended, Daggett was named the president and CEO of the Geraldine R. Dodge Foundation based in Morristown, New Jersey, one of the largest private foundations in the state of New Jersey. "This is a good opportunity to look at what are doing and why we are doing it, whether we can better spend our money and who we can work with collaboratively to have a bigger impact", said Daggett, who took over as CEO in June 2010.

Daggett resides in the Basking Ridge section of Bernards Township with his wife, Bea (née Horvath).

== 2009 gubernatorial campaign ==
On April 20, 2009, Daggett announced that he was entering the New Jersey gubernatorial race as an independent candidate. He raised enough money to qualify him for taxpayer matching funds, which would allow him to participate in televised debates with Governor Corzine and Republican candidate Christopher J. Christie.

On July 27, 2009, Daggett named Frank J. Esposito of Ocean Township as his ticket's candidate for lieutenant governor. Esposito is a history professor at Kean University and once served as interim president there.

In the gubernatorial race, Daggett received the endorsement of the New Jersey Sierra Club. It was the first time that the organization endorsed an independent candidate. He was also endorsed by Louise Wilson, mayor of Montgomery Township.

On October 10, 2009, Daggett was endorsed by New Jersey's largest circulated newspaper, The Star-Ledger. Recorder Newspapers, the parent company for 15 newspapers throughout central New Jersey, rescinded their endorsement for Chris Christie and issued an endorsement for Chris Daggett.

In late October, former New York City mayor Rudy Giuliani demanded Daggett withdraw from the race. Daggett replied: "I'd ask him to withdraw from New Jersey. I don't know why he's coming into New Jersey and trying to tell us how to run our state."

Daggett showed support as high as 20% in one statewide poll in October 2009. Yet, another statewide poll the same month reported his support at just 4% and asserted that pollsters should not have been reading his name to respondents and identifying him as an "independent" but letting respondents volunteer his name. He ultimately received 5.8% of the vote when the election was held on November 3, 2009.

== Electoral history ==
New Jersey Gubernatorial Election 2009
Party	Candidate	Votes	%	±%
Republican	Chris Christie	1,174,445	48.5	
Democratic	Jon Corzine	1,087,731	44.9	
Independent	Chris Daggett	139,579	5.8	
Republican gain from Democratic		Swing		

Political offices
Preceded by Richard T. Dewling	Commissioner of the New Jersey Department of Environmental Protection; 1988–1989	Succeeded by Judith A. Yaskin
