= New Jersey Route 183 =

State highway in Morris and Sussex Counties in New Jersey, United States

Route 183

Route information
- Maintained by New Jersey Department of Transportation
- Length: 2.12 mi (3.41 km)
- Existed: 1973–present

Major junctions
- South end: I-80 / US 206 in Roxbury
- US 46 in Netcong
- North end: US 206 in Stanhope

Location
- Country: United States
- State: New Jersey
- Counties: Morris, Sussex

Highway system
- New Jersey State Highway Routes; Interstate; US; State; Scenic Byways
← Route 182	→ Route 184

Route 183 is a 2.12-mile (3.41 km) long state highway in the northern regions of New Jersey. The southern end of the route is at an interchange with Interstate 80 and U.S. Route 206 (US 206) near Netcong, while the northern end is at an interchange with US 206 in Stanhope. The route heads northward through downtown Netcong and along the shores of Lake Musconetcong and enters Sussex County, New Jersey. The route is a former alignment of US 206 bypassed in 1973.

The highway dates back to the designations of State Highway Route 31, which was main north–south highway in New Jersey. The Netcong Circle, a traffic circle in Netcong between Route 183 and U.S. Route 46 was present for the entire lifetime of Route 183 until it was replaced by a signalized intersection in 2013. A nearby bridge over a New Jersey Transit line was also replaced.

== Route description ==
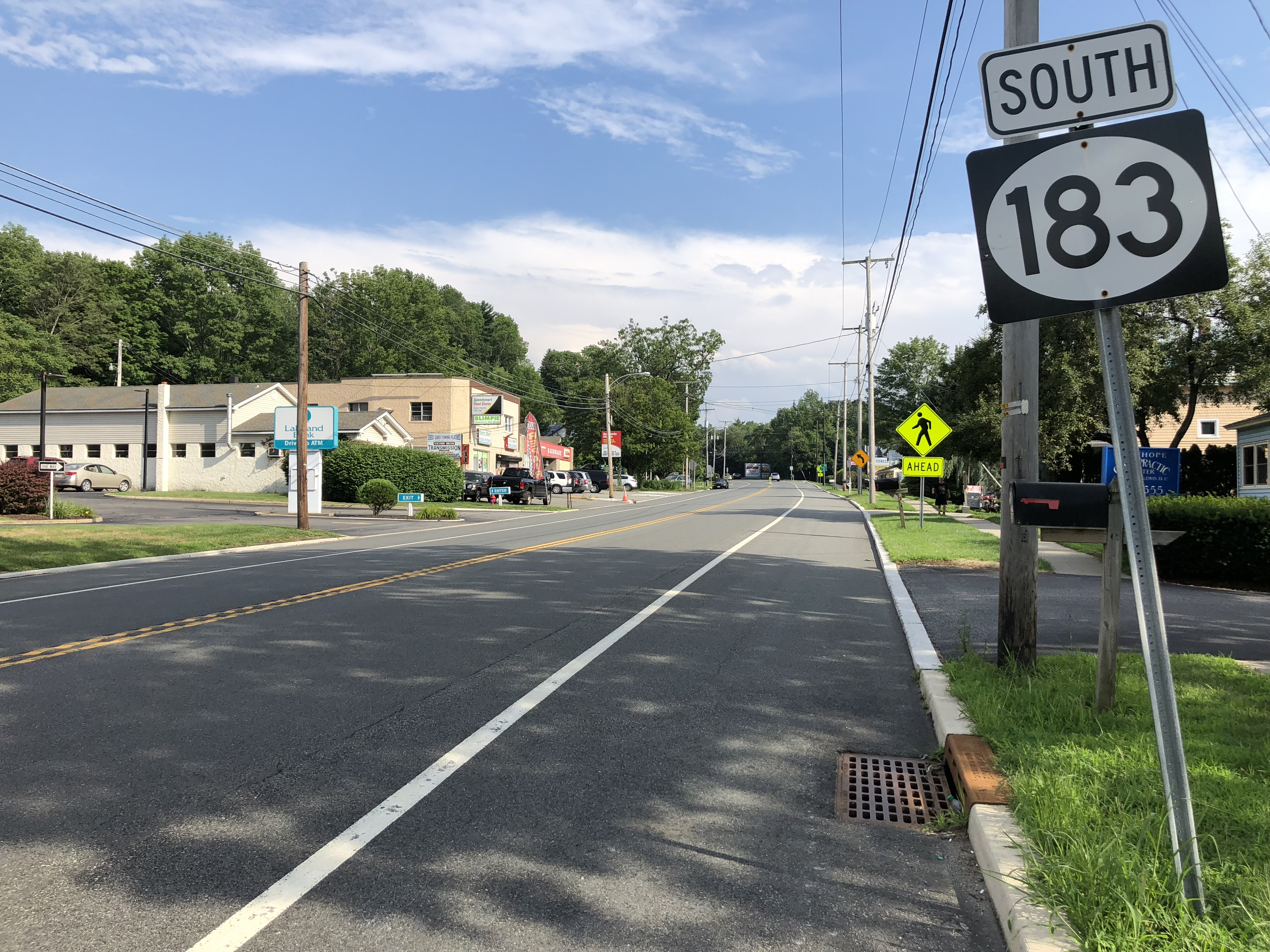
View south along Route 183 just south of Dell Road in Stanhope

Route 183 begins at a partial cloverleaf interchange with U.S. Route 206 and Interstate 80 in the community of Roxbury, New Jersey. The route heads northward, intersecting with local dead-end streets deep in the forests of rural Morris County. Route 183 passes a nearby factory and intersects U.S. Route 46. The route continues northward, crossing over a creek and entering downtown Netcong. Downtown Netcong is highly developed, and Route 183 serves as the main street through the community. The highway intersects with Allen Street (Morris County Route 631) before running along the shores of Lake Musconetcong and into Sussex County.

Upon entering Sussex County, Route 183 enters the community of Stanhope. At the intersection with Musconetcong Avenue, the highway turns to the northwest, leaving the shores of the lake. Route 183 continues through the residential developments in Stanhope, working its way into the mountains above the lake. The roadway passes west of a park and ride lot located at an American Legion hall. At the intersection with Dell Road, Route 183 becomes intertwined with the interchange on U.S. Route 206 northbound, and the highways merge a short distance later in Stanhope.

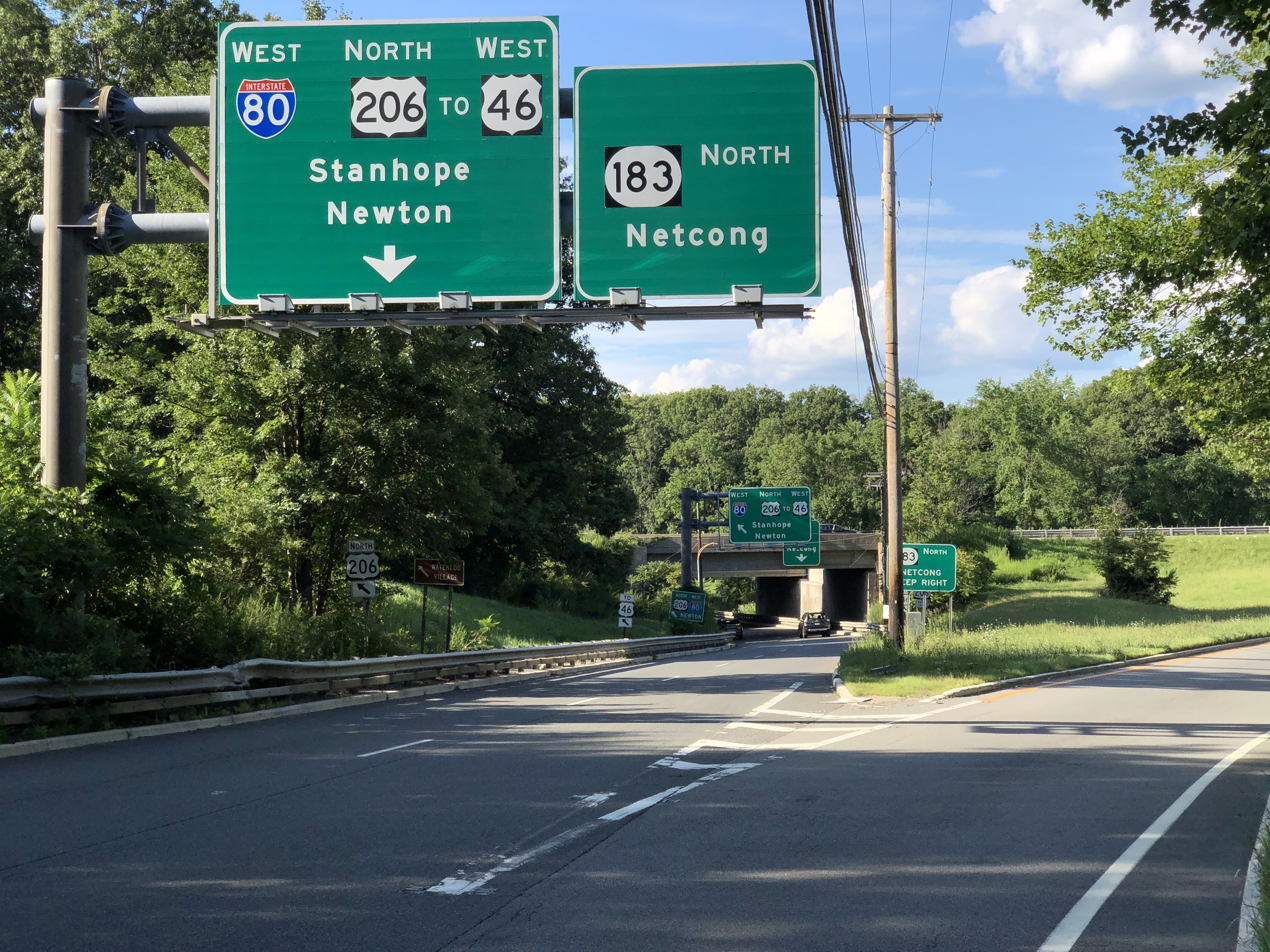
Route 183 northbound at I-80/US 206 in Roxbury Township

== History ==
The original designation in the area of Netcong along Route 183's alignment is State Highway Route 31, which consisted much of the alignment of current-day U.S. Route 206. The route was first assigned in the 1927 state highway renumbering as a co-designation to US 206. This alignment remained in place for about two and half decades, when in the 1953 state highway renumbering, the State Highway Route 31 designation was dropped in favor of using U.S. Route 206. The route in Netcong stayed the same for several years after the decommissioning until the Regional Plan Association proposed a freeway realignment of US 206 in 1962. The highway was to serve local recreation areas and relieve traffic on Interstate 287 to the east. The route was advocated through 1972, and after the fiscal year budgets went sour, the proposal was dropped.

Route 183 (before and after Netcong Circle removal)

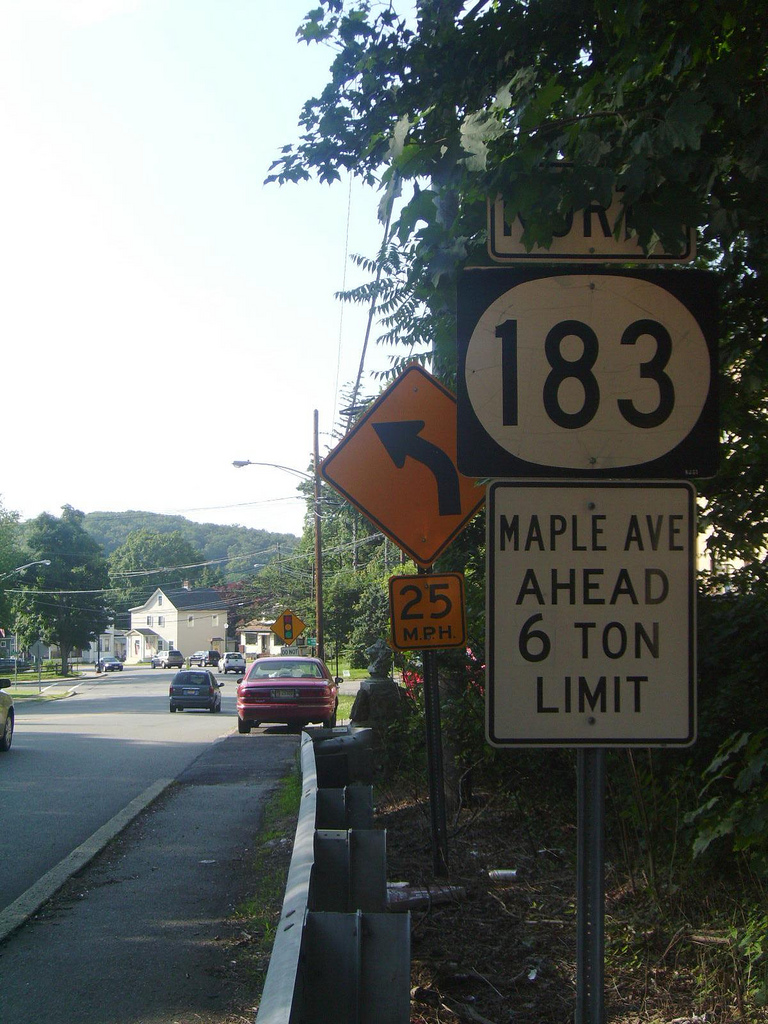
Route 183 heading northbound into downtown Netcong in June 2009, pre-elimination of the Netcong Circle.

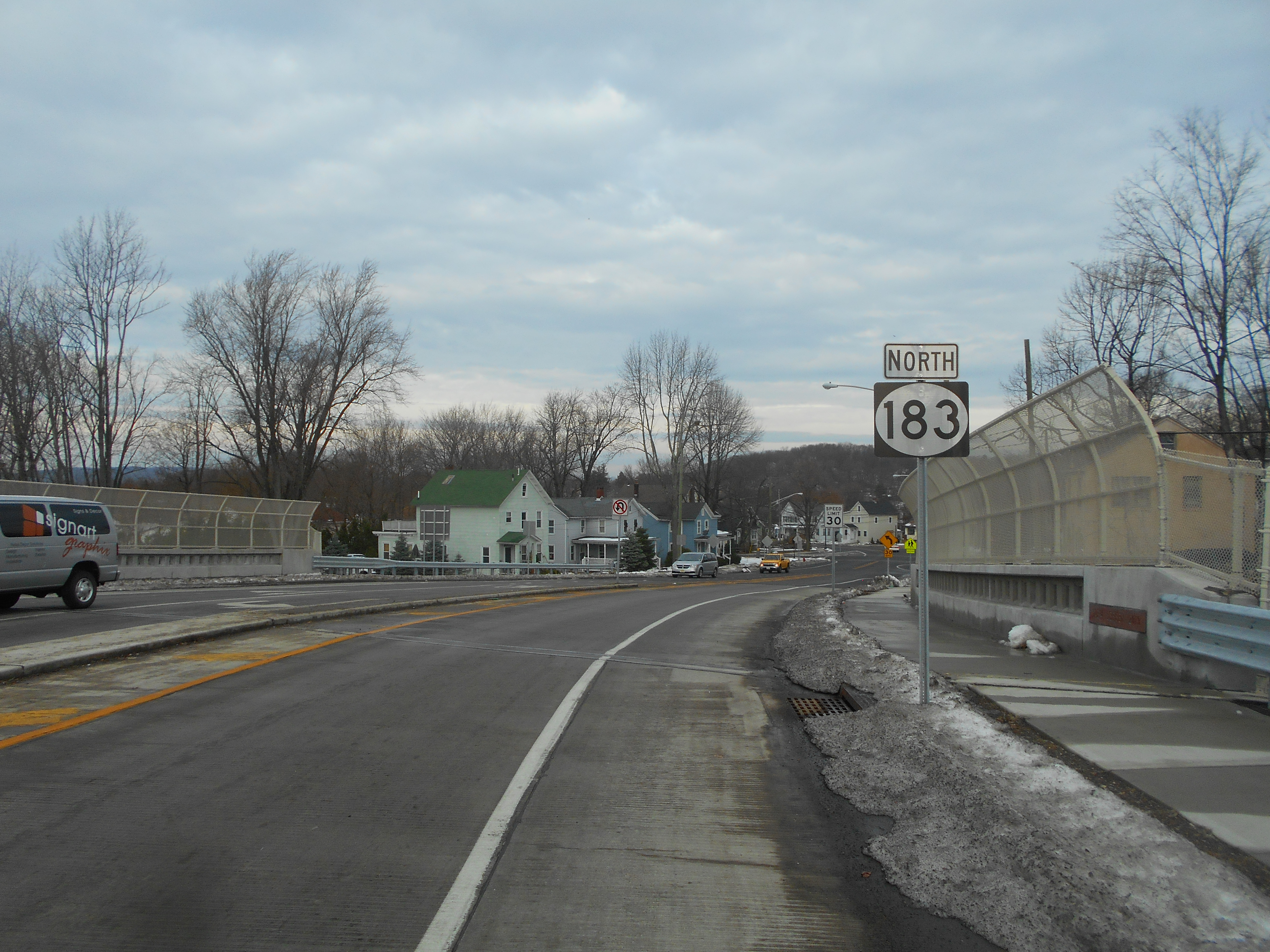
Route 183 heading northbound over the Montclair-Boonton Line in December 2014 after the elimination of the Netcong Circle.

In 2007, the New Jersey Department of Transportation proposed the elimination of the Netcong Traffic Circle, located at the intersections of U.S. Route 46 and Route 183 just north of the interchange with Interstate 80. The project was to produce two outcomes: replacement of the New Jersey Transit bridge that Route 183 crosses, and the elimination of the Netcong Circle with a signalized intersection. The project had issues dealing with the vertical clearance of the overpass for U.S. Route 46 westbound. The removal of the circle would eliminate this bridge, and the land would go to use as the new signalized intersection, with pedestrian and bicycle fittings. The entire project cost about $13.3 million (2009 USD) of state and local funds to construct. The Netcong Circle was replaced with a temporary junction in January 2013; the permanent intersection configuration opened in August of that year. The new bridge over the New Jersey Transit line opened in March 2013.

The circle itself dated back to construction in 1938. The circle itself could not handle the 17,000 vehicles a year that use the large roadway daily, and was the site of several accidents, including 45 in 2007 alone. The entire traffic circle conversion will eliminate two businesses in the area and is still slated for construction.

== Major intersections ==
County	Location	mi	km	Destinations	Notes
Morris	Roxbury	0.00	0.00	US 206 south	Southern terminus
Morris	Roxbury			I-80 / US 206 north – New York	Southbound exit and northbound entrance; exit 27B on I-80
Morris	Netcong	0.47	0.76	US 46 – Hackettstown, Delaware Water Gap, Dover, New York	Former Netcong Circle
Sussex	Stanhope	2.12	3.41	US 206 north	Northern terminus
1.000 mi = 1.609 km; 1.000 km = 0.621 mi
