= Bucks County Council =

Bucks County Council may refer to:

- Buckinghamshire County Council, the administrative body governing the county of Buckinghamshire, England
- Bucks County Council (Boy Scouts of America), a local council of the Boy Scouts of America
