= Stanhope House (United States) =

Music venue and restaurant in Stanhope, New Jersey

Coordinates: 40°54′9″N 74°42′29″W

The Stanhope House
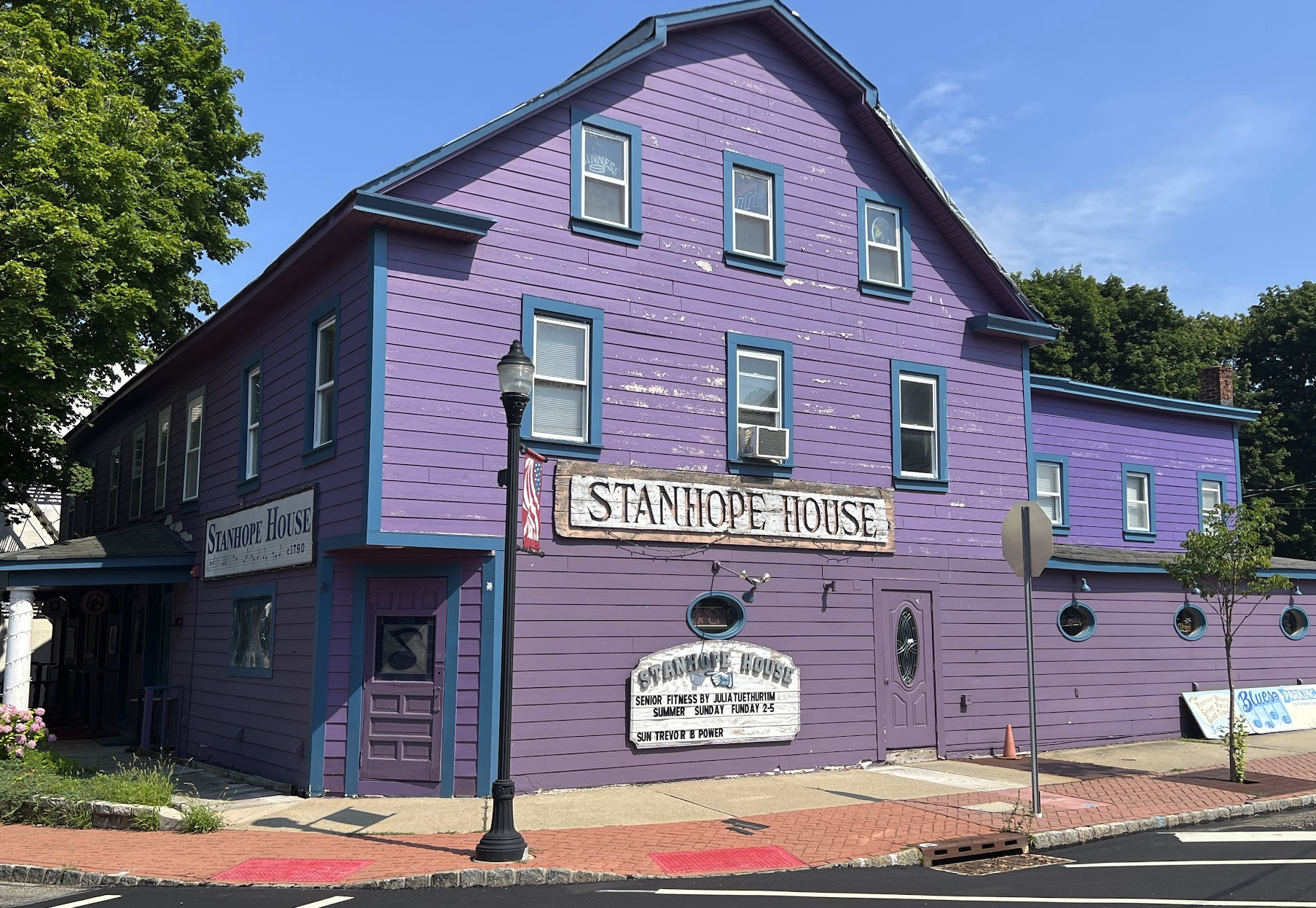
- Stanhope House in 2025
- Interactive map of The Stanhope House
- Address: 45 Main St; Stanhope, New Jersey 07874
- Capacity: 300

Construction
- Opened: 1790
- Closed: July 30, 2025

Website
- www.stanhopehousenj.com (currently broken)
Stanhope House
- Interactive map of the Stanhope House area

The Stanhope House was a historic music venue and restaurant in Stanhope, New Jersey. The building was constructed circa 1790 and served as a stagecoach stop, general store, tavern, and rooming house before gaining prominence as a live music venue. It became a notable part of the regional blues-rock scene in the 1970s and was referred to as "The Last Great American Roadhouse." The venue ceased operations in July 2025.

== History ==
=== Early years (c. 1790–1960s) ===
Built around 1790, the Stanhope House was a stop along stagecoach routes and later a general store and post office. It also functioned as a tavern and rooming house, and over its history, it was reportedly a brothel and a gambling hall. During the Prohibition era, baseball player Babe Ruth is said to have used the venue as a speakeasy.

=== The blues era (1970s) ===
The 1970s marked the Stanhope House's rise as a blues music institution. Musicians such as Muddy Waters, Buddy Guy, Stevie Ray Vaughan, Etta James, Albert King, and Johnny Winter performed on its stage. The venue's reputation was solidified by these performances and the venue became a significant location in the regional blues scene. A well-known story from this period is that a young Stevie Ray Vaughan, after a performance, helped the owner with cleanup by washing dishes.

=== Later years and revival (1980s–2025) ===
The venue experienced a decline in the 1980s but saw a resurgence in later decades. It expanded its musical offerings to include genres such as rock, indie, hip-hop, and comedy. In addition to music, it operated as a restaurant and beer garden.

=== Closure and legacy (2025) ===
The Stanhope House officially closed in 2025. On August 1, 2025, the closure was confirmed by news outlets, following an announcement that the venue had ceased operations on July 30, 2025. The closing followed previous concerns about the potential sale and redevelopment of the property. A community group, "Save the Stanhope House," had formed to try and prevent the closure.

The Stanhope House is considered a significant cultural landmark for its longevity and its role in reflecting various musical eras, particularly the blues-rock era. Its history also includes numerous reports of paranormal activity, with staff and visitors describing unexplained occurrences.
