= George Washington Council =

George Washington Council may be:

- George Washington Council (New Jersey)
- George Washington Council (Minnesota)
