= Patriots' Path Council =

Scout council in New Jersey

Coordinates: 40.8141°N 74.4647°W

Patriots' Path Council (#358)
- Owner: Scouting America
- Headquarters: Cedar Knolls, New Jersey
- Country: United States
- Founded: 2000
- President: Garrick Stoldt
- Council Commissioner: Gerard "Jay" Deboey
- Scout Executive: Marc T. Andreo
- Website http://www.ppcbsa.org

The Patriots' Path Council (PPC) is the Scouting America council that serves scouts in the counties of Morris, Sussex, Somerset, Union, and parts of Middlesex in New Jersey. It was established in 1999 with the merger of the Morris-Sussex Area Council (1936–1999) and the Watchung Area Council (1926–1999). On February 6, 2014, Patriots Path Council absorbed several Scouting units from the dissolved Central New Jersey Council (1999-2014).

== Organization ==
The council is divided into the following districts:

District Name	Communities Served	District Executive
Skylands	Andover Borough, Andover Township, Branchville Borough, Byram Township, Frankford Township, Franklin Borough, Fredon Township, Green Township, Hamburg Borough, Hampton Township, Hardyston Township, Hopatcong Borough, Lafayette Township, Montague Township, Netcong Borough, Ogdensburg Borough, Sandyston Township, Sparta Township, Stanhope Borough, Stillwater Township, Sussex Borough, Town of Newton, Vernon Township, Walpack Township, Wantage Township, Basking Ridge, Bedminster, Bernardsville, Brookside, Budd Lake, Chester, Denville, Dover, Far Hills, Flanders, Gladstone, Jefferson Township, Liberty Corner, Long Valley/Schooley's Mountain, Mendham, Mine Hill, Mt. Arlington, Mt. Olive, Peapack, Randolph, Rockaway Township, Rockaway (Borough), Roxbury, and Wharton	Rob Behan
Fishawack	Boonton, Boonton Township, Butler, Cedar Knolls, Chatham Borough, Chatham Township, East Hanover, Florham Park, Hanover, Harding Township, Kinnelon, Lincoln Park, Madison, Montville, Morris Plains, Morris Township, Morristown, Mountain Lakes, New Vernon, Parsippany, Pequannock, Riverdale, Towaco, Whippany	Sean Trimmer
Pioneer	Berkeley Heights, Fanwood, Garwood, Gillette, Long Hill Township, Meyersville, Millington, Mountainside, Murray Hill, New Providence, North Plainfield, Scotch Plains, Stirling, Summit, Warren, Watchung, Westfield, Avenel, Carteret, Clark, Colonia, Cranford, Elizabeth, Fords, Hillside, Iselin, Kenilworth, Linden, New Brunswick, Perth Amboy, Port Reading, Rahway, Roselle, Roselle Park, Springfield, Union, Winfield Park, and Woodbridge	Brian Day
Raritan Valley	Bound Brook, Bradley Gardens, Branchburg, Bridgewater, Dunellen, Edison, Finderne, Flagtown, Green Brook, Highland Park, Hillsborough, Lamington, Manville, Martinsville, Metuchen, Middlesex, New Brunswick, Neshanic, Neshanic Station, North Branch, Piscataway, Plainfield, Pluckemin, Raritan, Somerset, Somerville, South Bound Brook, South Branch, and South Plainfield	Marc Maratea
Jockey Hollow	All communities within the Patriots' Path Council. The Jockey Hollow District works with special needs Scouts	

== Camps ==
=== Winnebago Scout Reservation ===
Winnebago Scout Reservation
- Location: Rockaway, New Jersey
- Founded: August 3, 1941

==== History ====
Although the camp was founded in 1941, the history of the property dates back farther. The Lenni Lenape Indians were early inhabitants of the area. During the Revolutionary War iron mines were established. Norwegian immigrants came and built dairy farms in the 1800s. In the early 1900s, Durham Pond was created by intentional flooding to provide water for New Jersey's growing population. In 1916, a troop from Montclair camped by the pond. However, they had to leave after a week due to complications.

The land was purchased in 1940. By 1941, an actual camp was established. The admission fee was $7.50 per scout. Each campsite had an icebox, stove, and a latrine with water pumped from a well. Food was included in the price, but it had to be cooked by the campers. There were 5 campsites, each with room for 30 campers. Scouts slept on mattresses stuffed with straw inside tents.

==== Facilities ====
North End

- Camp Office
- Flintlocks Building is where the "Flintlocks BSA, Inc."- a group of retired scouter volunteers- have a state-of-the-art workshop to do camp repairs, build facilities, and make craft kits.
- Winter Lodge is staff housing and used for off-season camping.
- Kiwanis Cabin Sleeps 18. Contains wood stove, electric cooking stove, stainless sink & counter, refrigerator, table and benches, electricity, running water from April 15 – October 15.
- Winnebago Cabin Sleep 12. Contains wood stove, table and chairs, electricity.
- Little Mahee Cabin Sleeps 10. Contains wood stove, table with benches, electricity. 2 adjacent lean-tos are available separately.
- Wink Dousa Cabin Sleeps 20. Contains wood stove, table and benches, electricity.
- Bath and Shower House Hot water and flush toilets for all campers. Open year-round.

South End

- Corwin Training Center Sleeps 40. Contains gas heat, tables and chairs, separate kitchen area with large gas range, refrigeration, electricity, year round water and restrooms.
- Lewis Cabin Sleeps 12. Contains Wood stove, tables and chairs, electricity.
- Craig Cabin Sleeps 16 in main room + 4 inside room. Contains Propane heat (fee), tables and chairs, electricity.
- Garrity Cabin Sleeps 12. Contains propane heat (fee), tables and chairs, electricity.
- Searing Cabin/Site Cabin Sleeps 4. Lean-to Sleeps 4. Contains wood stove, tables and chairs, electricity, one lean-to.

==== Campsites ====
North End

- Algonquin
- Cayuga
- Cherokee
- Cheyenne
- Chippewa
- Comanche
- Delaware
- Iroquois
- Lenape Site Sleeps 24. Contains Six Lean-tos and Pavilion.
- Onondanga Site Sleeps 24. Contains Six Lean-tos and Pavilion.
- Shawnee Site Sleeps 16. Contains Four Lean-tos.
- Wacabuc
- Witauchsundin

South End

- CJ Helen
- Craig Field large open group site

Frontier Sites (Primitive sites on east side of Durham Pond)

- Jim Bowie
- Kit Carson

=== Mt. Allamuchy Scout Reservation ===
Mt. Allamuchy Scout Reservation
- Location: Stanhope, New Jersey
- Founded: 1949

==== Facilities ====
- Cabin #1 Sleeps 14. Double bunks with mattresses. Contains wood stove, 4-burner electric range top, table, tent camping around cabin, latrine.
- Cabin #4 Sleeps 24. Double bunks with mattresses. Contains a room with 2 double bunks and mattress, and a full-size fridge. Outside contains 3 4-burner gas stoves, and a fire pit.
- Cabin #5 Sleeps 12. Double bunks with mattresses. Contains wood stove, tables, tent camping around cabin, latrine and close to off-season water supply.
- Cabin #6 Sleeps 12. Double bunks with mattresses. Contains wood Stove, 4 electric burner range top, tables, tent camping around site, latrine and close to off season water supply.
- OA Lodge Sleeps 28. Double bunks with mattresses (4 – back room, 24 – front). Contains oil heat, full kitchen, tables and chairs, tent camping in back, close to lake. Year-round water and flush toilet.
- Tuney Lodge Meeting room only, no sleeping. Contains conference table, seating for 25, bathroom, heat and air conditioning flush toilet, and 8 computers for scouts to work on merit badges. During summer camp, Eagles Nest is housed in here.
- Hartley Lodge (Dining) Hall Capacity: Seats 300 (12 to a table). Contains kitchen available for extra fee in warm months only – May 1 to October 31.
- Bath and Shower House Hot water and flush toilets for all campers. Open year-round.
- Ham Shack Camp Somers' Amateur (Ham) Radio Station.

==== Campsites ====
- Site 2 (5 Lean-tos) – barrier-free site near parking lot
- Site 3A
- Site 6a
- Site 3B
- Site 4 (Shelter)
- Site 5 (Shelter)
- Site 6A (Shelter)
- Site 6B
- Site 7 (2 Lean-tos)
- Site 8
- Site 9 (Shelter)
- Site 10A
- Site 10B
- Site 10C
- Site 11
- Site 12A (Shelter)
- Site 12B
- Site 13

==== Facilities ====
- Wheeler Office Sleeps 25 for meetings or 15 cots for sleeping. Contains wood stove or propane heat, electricity, refrigerator, small microwave.

Flush toilets in season. (April 15 – October 15)

- Wolf Den #1 Sleeps 24, Double bunks with mattresses. Contains wood stove, latrine. Tent camping around site.
- Wolf Den #2 Sleeps 24, Double bunks with mattresses. Contains wood stove, latrine. Tent camping around site.

==== Campsites ====
- Site 17
- Site 20 (Shelter)
- Site 21
- Site 22
- Site 23

== Formerly Owned Camps ==
=== Sabattis Adventure Camp ===
Sabattis Adventure Camp
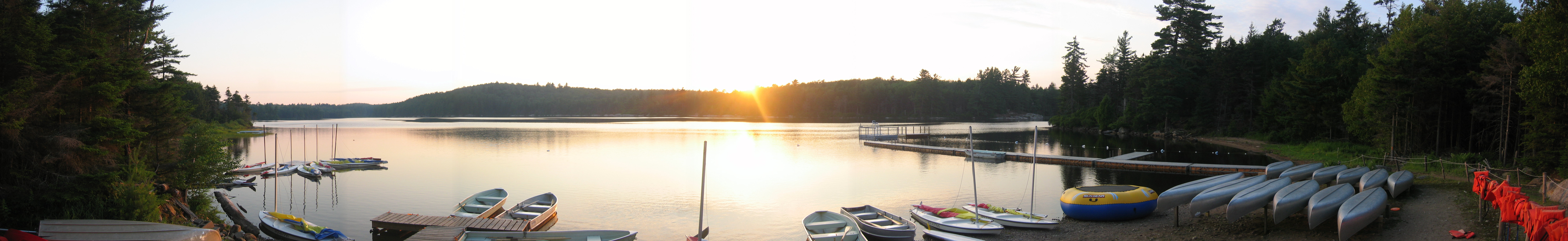
- Bear Pond, Long Lake, New York
- Location: Long Lake, New York
- Founded: 1959

Sabattis Adventure Camp was a Boy Scout camp located in the Adirondack Park in New York State. The camp was owned by the Patriots' Path Council until scouting America had to file for bankruptcy and the PPC sold the camp pay their share of the $1.9 billion settlement in October 2021. A neighboring camp purchased the property in early 2022. In the sale terms, it states that Patriots' Path Council can still use the property for camping for the next 5 years.

The camp, usually in operation from early July to early August, offered Scouts the chance to spend a week at camp, where they participated in various camp activities and worked on completing merit badges, or went on a trek, where they hiked or canoed for most of the week.

Sabattis Adventure Camp offered week-long canoeing or backpacking treks. A minimum of seven participants could travel through 20 to 100 miles of wilderness, depending on the ability level of the participants.

==== History ====
The land where the camp now stands was originally the estate of swimmer and Olympic Gold Medalist Charles Daniels. Most of the grounds occupied by the camp are the remains of a nine-hole golf course Daniels built for his wife, the most visible portion of which is the parade grounds, next to the camp's trading post, which still looks like the green that it once was. He built the golf course to convince his wife to come up with him. The spot where the flagpole stands now is one of the original putting greens. The actual mansion that the Daniels lived in was located near what is now Family Camp, next to the lake. The house, called Tarnedge, was dismantled in the early 1970s and few visible reminders of it remain. The Doll House, which he had built for his daughter to play in, still stood as of when it was sold, and was used to house staff. The path leading to the Mohawk camp site was the original main entrance to the estate, and the stone wall lining it is still there in fairly good condition, along with the main gates near the main road.

==== Facilities ====
- The Mexican House was the camp office and housed the offices of the Camp Director, Program Director, and Business Manager.
- The Health Lodge housed the health officer and staff members. The Health Lodge also had the office of the health officer. The health officer offered the First Aid MB and CPR training.
- The Barn (built in 1910) formally housed the Staff Lounge, the Ranger Shed, Mountain Biking program, Adult/Staff Showers and a large room for program. The barn was re-painted in 2000. It was condemned in 2011 due to the deteriorating structure of the building, and demolished in 2019, being replaced by a new metal warehouse style storage building.
- The Trading Post housed staff members and contains the Camp Trading Post.
- The Doll House is located down the hill in front of the Trek Center was complete with a living room, dining room, kitchen, bath and two bedrooms and a cellar with a furnace. It was used as a playhouse for Charles Daniels' children and was built on a three-fourths scale. The building was condemned some time before the camp was sold.
- The Trek Center was the base for the Adirondack Treks. There were typically 4 treks are offered per week. A unit was assigned a Voyageur guide to guide them through the Adirondacks. Both backpacking and canoeing treks were offered. All Trekking activities were directed by the Trek Director. The Trek Center was transferred in 2005 from the Family Camp Building.
- The Commissary The commissary is behind the former putting green and parade field. It housed all the food needed for scouts to pick up at every meal. Additionally, this building serves as the staff dining hall.

==== Campsites ====
- Abenaki (Trek)
- Apache
- Blackfoot
- Cherokee
- Delaware
- Iroquois
- Mohawk
- Mohican
- Seneca

==== Summer Camp ====
The residential camp program at Sabattis Adventure Camp offered Scouts a chance to have fun while working on merit badges, personal advancement, and patrol or troop advancement.

The following Merit Badges were offered:

- Scoutraft: Camping, Pioneering, Wilderness Survival, Orienteering, Emergency Preparedness, Cooking, Geocaching, Leatherworking, Scouting Heritage, and Woodcarving
- Ecology: Environmental Science, Fish & Wildlife Management, Soil & Water Conservation, Reptile and Amphibian Study, Fishing, Forestry, Geology, Weather, Mammal Study and Astronomy.
- Aquatics: Swimming, Lifesaving, Canoeing, Rowing, Small Boat Sailing, Kayaking
- Shooting Sports: Rifle Shooting, Shotgun Shooting, Archery
- Climbing/COPE: Climbing

Other in-camp programs included high ropes COPE course, climbing tour, mountain biking, two 29 ft war canoes, Charley's Mountain hike and overnight, field archery, muzzle loader shooting and many others.

== Woapalanne Lodge ==
The Order of the Arrow is served by Woapalanne Lodge.

In 1999, the Boy Scouts of America oversaw a number of council mergers. In 2000, the Morris-Sussex Area Council (based in Denville, NJ) and the Watchung Area Council (based in Mountainside, N.J.) underwent such a merger, forming the Patriots’ Path Council – now based out of Cedar Knolls, N.J.

As there can only be one lodge for every council, there were merger meetings between the two lodges (Allemakewink #54 and Miquin #68). Since it was a NOAC year, and Allemakewink was both celebrating its 70th anniversary and hosting a Section Conclave, it did not want to merge immediately. The merger committee decided it was best to merge the lodges in the following year. The merger committee wanted the number to be low because both prior lodges had lower numbers (#54 and #68) and wanted to incorporate elements of the two previous lodges into the new one. The name decided on was Woapalanne #43, roughly translating to “eagle”. The merger committee decided that the lodge color would be green, and that the totem would be an eagle with outlined feathers. In 2005, however, the totem was modified by the LEC to incorporate the eagle exclusively.

In the spring of 2001, the lodge held its first Fellowship Day, and two Ordeal Weekends. The lodge decided to have two Ordeal Weekends in the spring (one at each camp) and one Ordeal Weekend in the fall (rotating the camp). Also starting in 2001, the lodge decided to hold an annual OA Day at each summer camp at which service would be accompanied by a brotherhood conversion ceremony for eligible Ordeal members and a cracker barrel for all brothers attending camp. .

In 2002, Woapalanne participated in its first NOAC at Indiana University. The theme was “Test Yourself and So Discover”. Woapalanne was one of only two lodges in the Northeast Region and one of only eight in the country to earn the E. Urner Goodman Camping Award.

In 2003, Woapalanne held its first section conclave for Section NE-2B at Mt. Allamuchy Scout Reservation. In 2004, the lodge LEC voted to give a donation to the council for the purchase of a new sailboat for Camp Somers. The boat was named the S.S. Woapalanne, in honor of the donation. In the fall of 2004, the lodge created a new campsite near the chapel at Camp Somers. Site 14 received the name “Woapalanne” to commemorate the lodge's service in its construction.

On Jan. 1, 2006, the lodge celebrated its 5th anniversary.

In 2008, the sections were reshuffled, and Woapalanne was allocated to Section NE-7A, along with Central NJ, Northern NJ, and Greater NY council lodges.

In 2009 the lodge was designated a Quality Lodge for the year.

The lodge earned JTE Gold Status in 2013, and once again in 2014.

Brothers from the dissolved Central NJ Council and Sakuwit Lodge #2 were absorbed into PPC and Woaplanne Lodge in 2014.

The lodge secured a National Service Grant in 2015.

In 2020, COVID-19 caused a decline in the lodge's membership.

Brianna Brady was elected as the first female Lodge Chief in Woaplanne's history in 2023. As of 2026, Woaplanne has had three consecutive female Lodge Chiefs.

== See also ==
- Scouting in New Jersey
- Scouting in New York
