= Stanhope United Methodist Church =

Historic church in New Jersey, United States

- U.S. National Register of Historic Places
- New Jersey Register of Historic Places
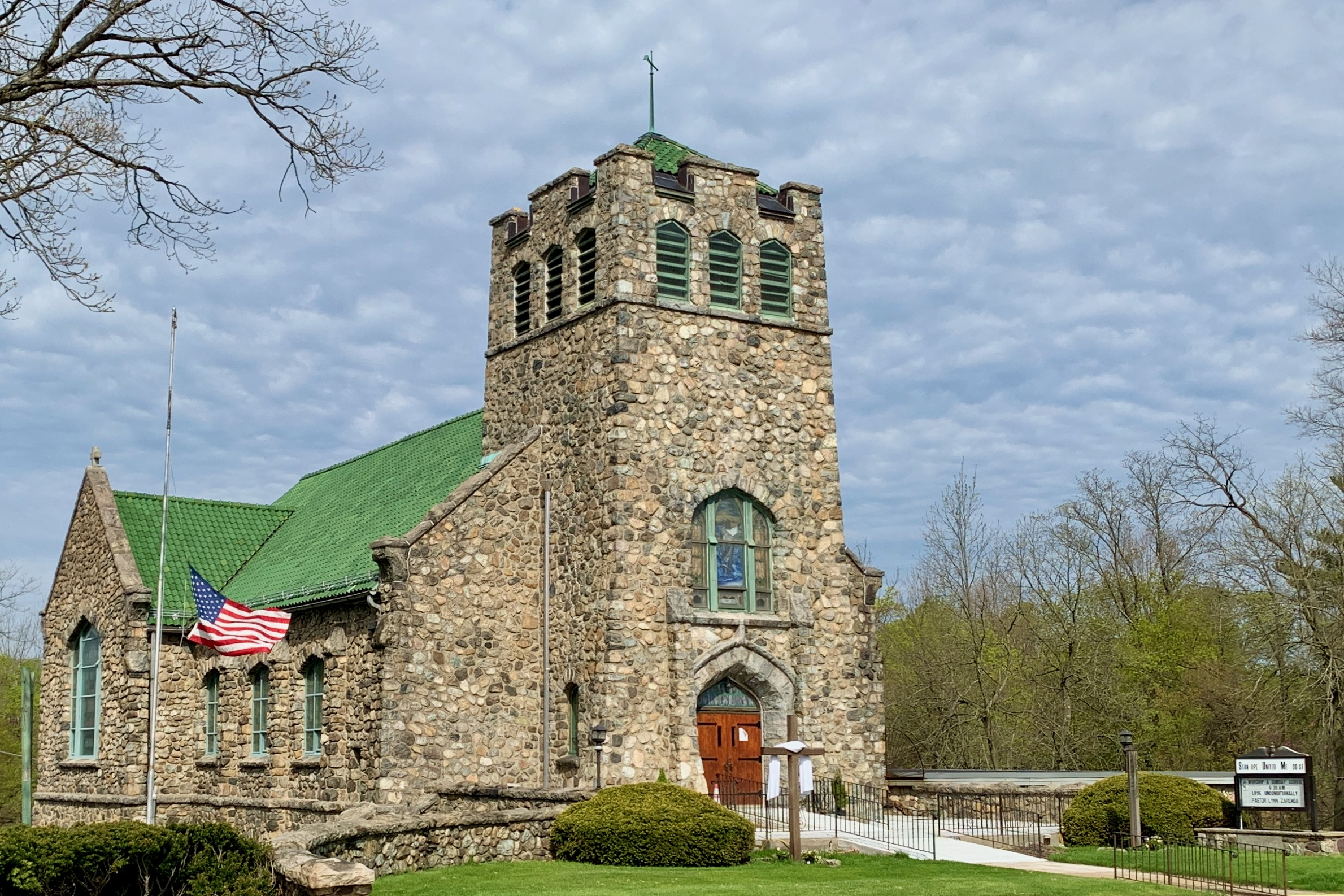
- The Church in the Glen in 2020

- Location within Morris County, New Jersey Location within New Jersey Location within the United States
- Location: 2 Ledgewood Avenue, Netcong, New Jersey
- Coordinates: 40°54′5″N 74°42′19″W
- Area: 2.2 acres (0.89 ha)
- Built: 1920
- Architect: Floyd Yard Parsons
- Architectural style: Late Gothic Revival, Tudor Revival
- NRHP reference No.: 12001127
- NJRHP No.: 5209

Significant dates
- Added to NRHP: January 2, 2013
- Designated NJRHP: October 15, 2012

The Stanhope United Methodist Church is a historic church built 1920 in the borough of Netcong in Morris County, New Jersey, United States. It is across the Musconetcong River from Stanhope. Historically known as The Church in the Glen, it was added to the National Register of Historic Places on January 2, 2013 for its significance in architecture.

== History and description ==
The first Methodist church in the area was built in 1835 in Lockwood. From 1839 to 1844, the Plaster Mill in Stanhope was used for services. In 1844, a new frame church was built on Linden Avenue in Stanhope. Construction of the current stone church in Netcong was started in 1917 and completed in 1920. It was designed by the ecclesiastical architect Floyd Yard Parsons and features Tudor Revival and English Gothic styles.

== Gallery ==
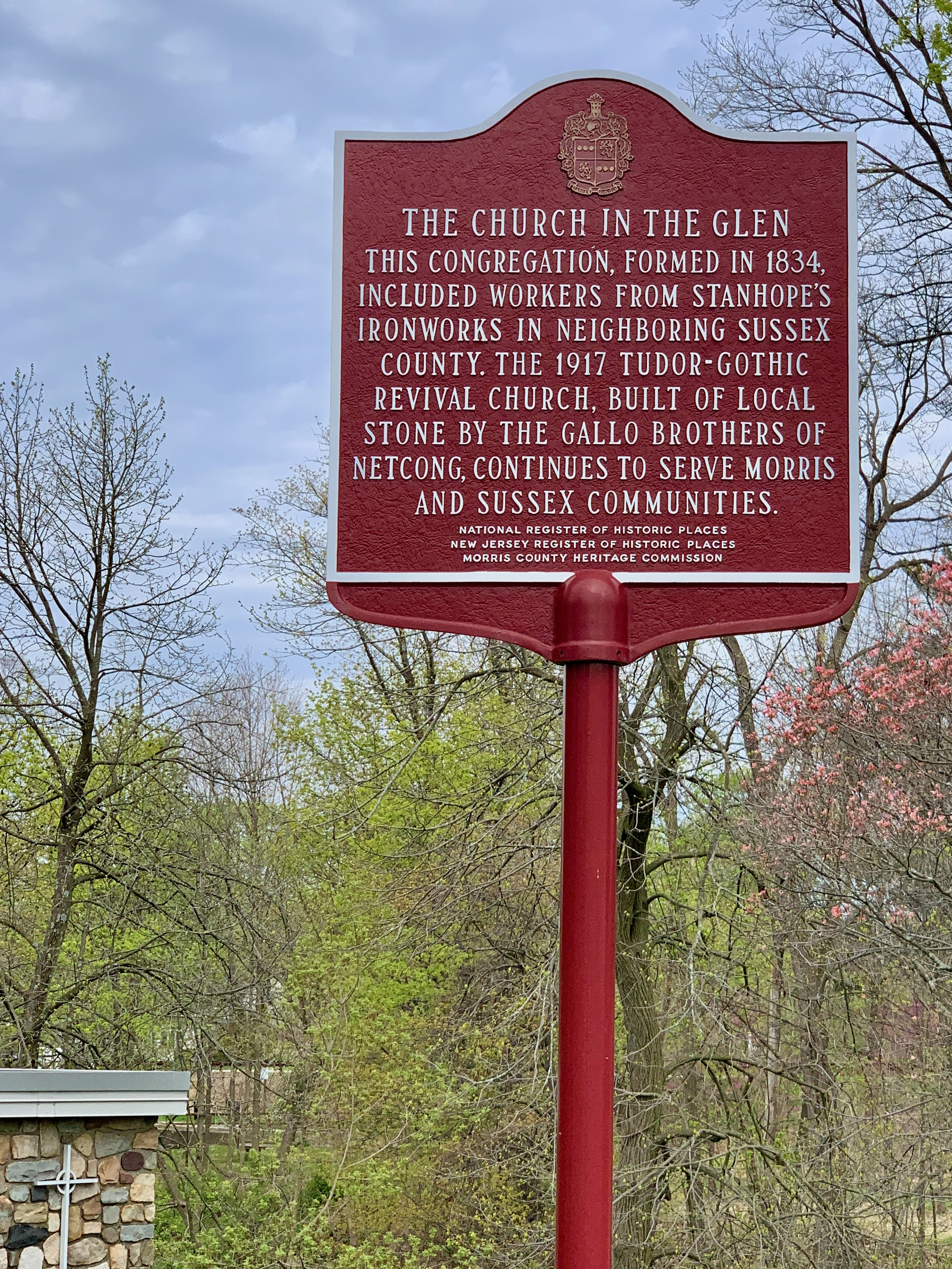
Historic information sign

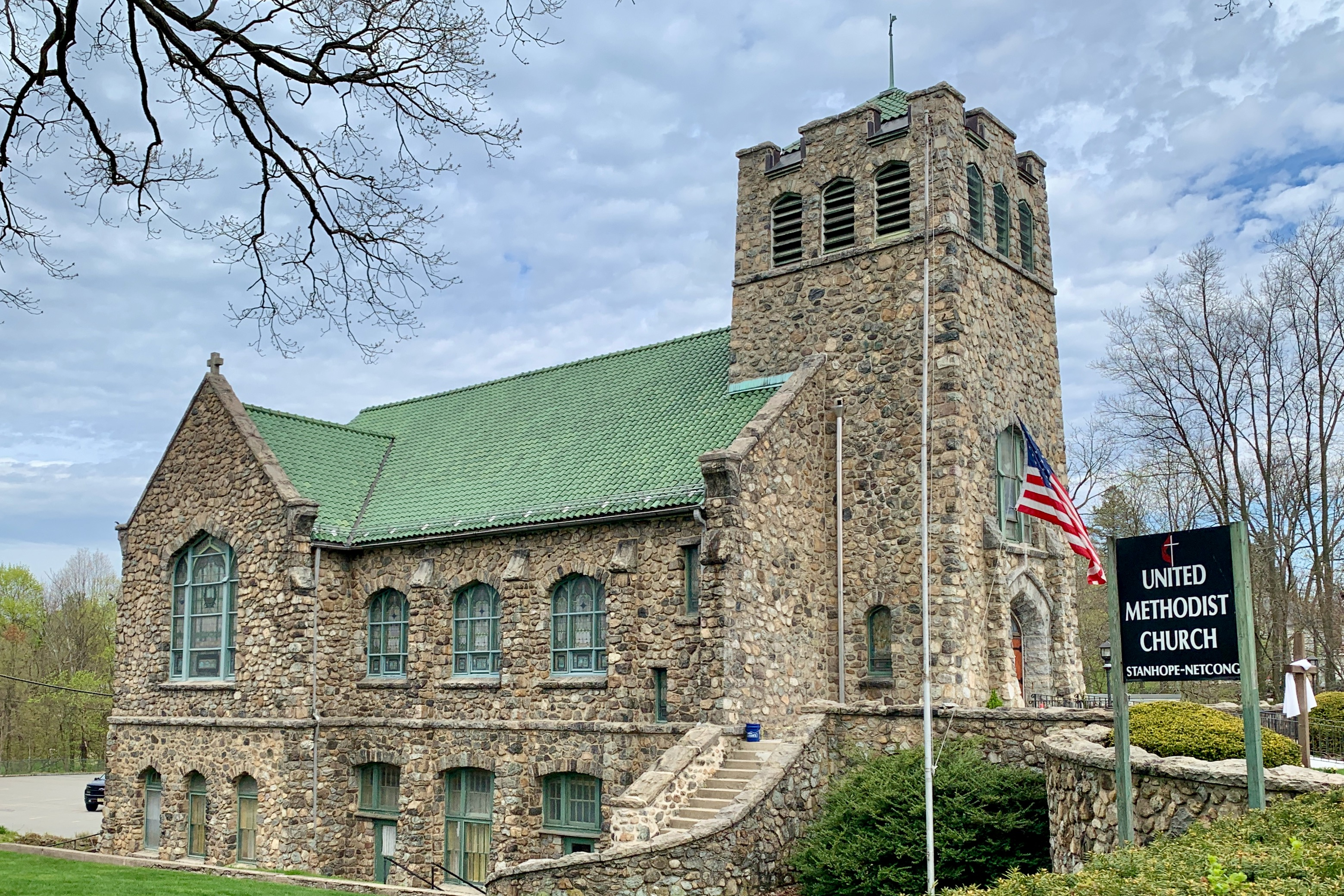
Looking northwest

== See also ==
- National Register of Historic Places listings in Morris County, New Jersey
- List of Methodist churches in the United States
