= Central New Jersey Council =

Local council of Scouting America

- Owner: Boy Scouts of America
- Headquarters: Dayton, New Jersey
- Country: United States
- Founded: 1999
- Defunct: February 28, 2014
- President: Terrance McCarty
- Council Commissioner: Andy Jost
- Scout Executive: (vacant)
- Website http://www.cnjcscouting.org

Central New Jersey Council is a former local Boy Scouts of America council that served the central New Jersey area, spanning across the Counties of Hunterdon, Mercer, Middlesex and Warren.

Due to financial difficulties, the council de facto dissolved on February 28, 2014, and all units were transferred to neighboring councils. As a corporation, the Council will remain intact until a variety of business items, including the sale of camp properties, is complete.

== Organization ==
Central New Jersey Council had four active districts. The Joyce Kilmer District served the Milltown area. The Mattameechen District covered the areas of South River, Edison, Metuchen, East Brunswick, Old Bridge, Spotswood and the Raritan Bay area. Pahaquarra District covered Hunterdon and Warren Counties. Finally, the Mercer Area District covered all of Mercer County and part of Somerset County. These districts combined contained nearly two hundred units, including Boy Scout troops, Cub Scout packs and Venturing crews.

== History ==
Central New Jersey Council was officially chartered on January 1, 1999 after the merger of the former George Washington and Thomas A. Edison Councils. After the chartering, the council adopted two main camps, the first being Yards Creek Scout Reservation from the George Washington Council and the second being Kittatinny Mountain Scout Reservation from the Thomas A. Edison Council. Kittatinny was and is being used for summer camping and year-round short-term camping, whereas Yards Creek is used for short-term camping.

In 1999, the council sold the Edison, New Jersey office from the Thomas A. Edison Council and temporarily headquartered itself in Pennington, New Jersey until the renovation of a combined office on Route 1 in Monmouth Junction, New Jersey was completed on June 12, 1999. The council moved to new offices at 2245 US Highway 130, Suite 106, in Dayton, NJ in November 2008.

The council initially started operations with six internal districts, each of the two former council-areas having three districts. The Hunterdon Arrowhead, Jenny Jump and Mercer Area Districts were moved from George Washington Council and were essentially kept the same, although the districts from the former Thomas A. Edison Council were re-organized into the Joyce Kilmer, Raritan Bay and SEMEOS Districts. In 2008, the Hunterdon Arrowhead and Jenny Jump Districts merged to form the Pahaquarra District, bringing the total number of districts to five. In 2010, the SEMEOS and Raritan Bay Districts merged to form the Mattameechen District, bringing the total number of districts to four.

In November 2013, the council board, citing low corporate donations leading to a fiscal crisis for the council amongst other factors, voted to dissolve the Central New Jersey Council. As of January 1, 2014, all the units which are served by the Central New Jersey Council were moved into neighboring councils in order to continue serving the boys in their respective communities. Pahaquarra District was bifurcated along county lines. Units from Pahaquarra District located in Warren County were transferred to Minsi Trails Council's Forks of the Delaware District. Units of Pahaquarra District located in Hunterdon County were regrouped under the previous name of the Hunterdon Arrowhead District, assigned to Bucks County Council.

On February 6, 2014, the Executive Board of the Central New Jersey Council met to discuss the issue of assigning to neighboring councils the remaining territory of CNJC not already transferred. They approved the proposal of remaining CNJC units in Middlesex County (Mattameechen and Joyce Kilmer Districts) to be transferred based on the following: Scouting units North of the Raritan River were transferred to Patriots' Path Council while Scouting units South of the Raritan were transferred to Monmouth Council.

== Camps ==
Central New Jersey Council used to operate two camps in New Jersey, Kittatinny Mountain Scout Reservation and Yards Creek Scout Reservation. First opened in 1972, Yards Creek was a 510 acres (2.1 km^{2}) camp located in the grounds of the Yards Creek Pumping Station in Blairstown, New Jersey near both the Appalachian Trail and the Delaware Water Gap. The camp was restricted to short-term use, specifically for units who take day trips to the Appalachian Trail and Delaware River and require the use of camp facilities for a short periods.

Located in Sandyston Township, New Jersey within walking distance of the Appalachian Trail, Kittatinny Mountain Scout Reservation, also called KMSR, was used for short term periods. Central New Jersey Council has stated that the camp offers ways to help create "better units, qualified scouters, and skillful, self-reliant boys and young men". The camp comprises over 500 acres (2.0 km^{2}) in the Stokes State Forest. Issues with low attendance, the dam, the septic system and other needed improvements at Kittatinny Mountain Scout Reservation have led to discussions on sale of the camp. In 2009, it was decided that KMSR would be sold to an appropriate buyer" and YCSR would be used for short-term purposes only.

Camp Pahaquarra, was active from 1925 to 1971 and was the first council-wide camp owned by the George Washington Council. The 1,000 acres (400 ha) camp was the site of commercial copper mines that were no longer open.

== Order of the Arrow ==
Central New Jersey Council's Order of the Arrow lodge was Sakuwit Lodge, and, including the former lodges merged into it, the lodge's history is the second oldest in the United States. The lodge was officially founded on September 2, 1999 after the mergers of Sanhican Lodge 2, of the George Washington Council, and Narraticong Lodge 9, of the Thomas A. Edison Council. The name "Sakuwit" translates to "from the mouth of two rivers," representing the merger of the two lodges and the lodge's proximity to the Delaware and Raritan Rivers. According to the Sakuwit Lodge website, the current Lodge Chief, or leader of the lodge, is Andy Monken. Part of the Northeast Region of the Order of the Arrow, Sakuwit Lodge was part of Section NE-5A (Northeast Region, Area 5, Section A).
