= Gamaliel Bartlett =

American postmaster (1796–1859)

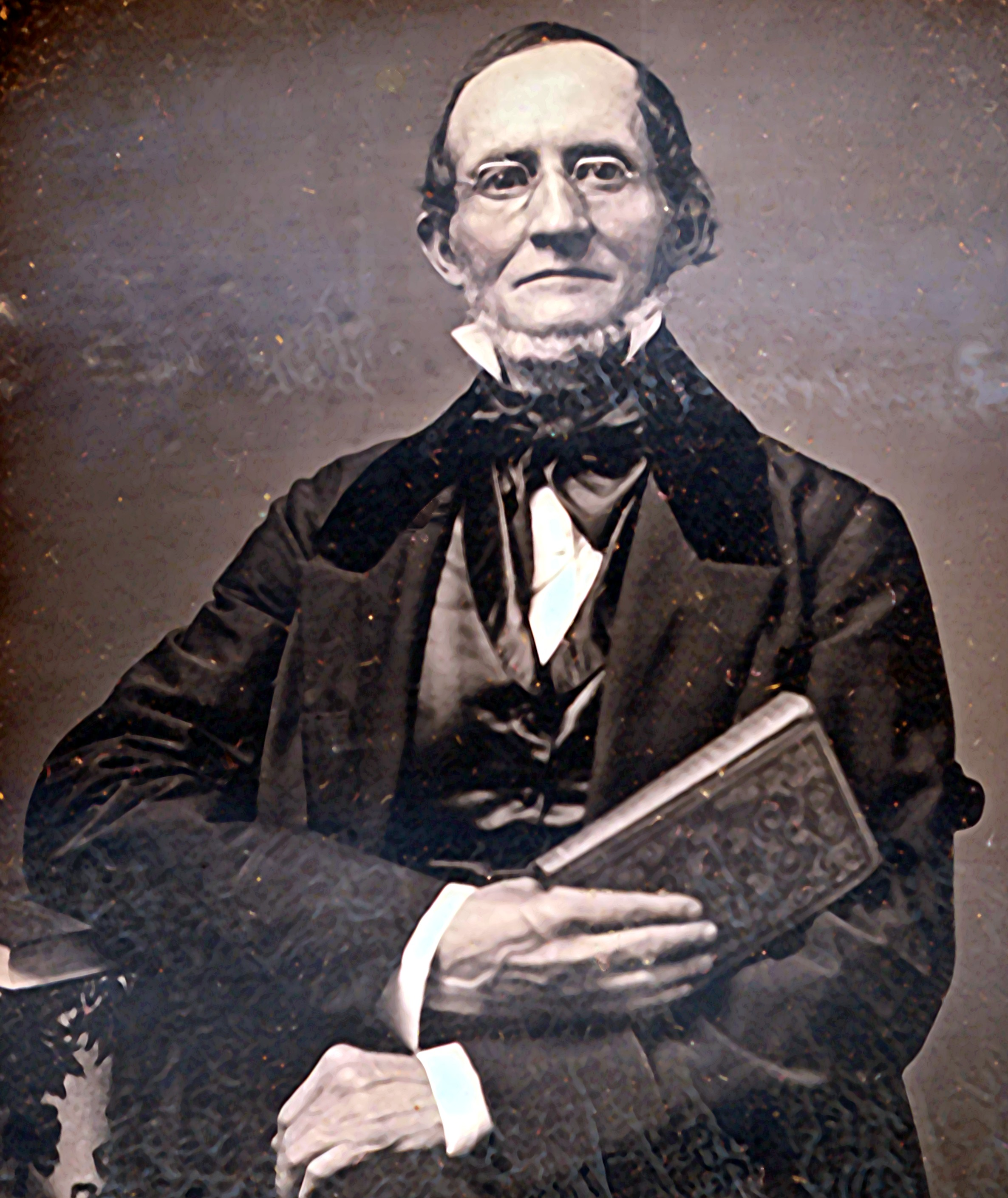

Gamaliel Bartlett (November 27, 1796 – November 10, 1859) was the first postmaster of Stanhope, New Jersey. He was appointed to the position in 1823 by President James Monroe. In 1829 Bartlett petitioned the Sussex County Court for a license to "keep an Inn or Tavern in the house in which he now lives, in the Township of Byram". It was signed by the 16 town council members (referred to as Freeholders). Probably the location of the proposed licensed premises was what is locally referred to as The Stanhope House.

== Morris Canal ==
Bartlett was involving with bringing about the Morris Canal section and Morris Canal and Banking Company. The Palladium of Liberty, a Morristown, New Jersey, newspaper of the day, reported on August 29, 1822:

Membership of a committee which studied the practicality of a canal from Pennsylvania to Newark, New Jersey, consisted of two prominent citizens from each county (NJ) concerned: Hunterdon County, Nathaniel Saxton, Henry Dusenberry; Sussex County, Morris Robinson, Gamaliel Bartlett; Morris County, Lewis Condict, Mahlon Dickerson; Essex County, Gerald Rutgers, Charles Kinsey; Bergen County, John Rutherford, William Colefax.

During November 1829, William C. Lewis announced his intention of joining Gamaliel Bartlett's blacksmithing business in Stanhope.

In 1833, Bartlett would find himself embroiled in a lawsuit entitled President and Directors of the Morris Canal and Banking Co. vs. Gamaliel Bartlett. The case took four days to try before Justice Ford. On May 30, 1833, Gamaliel Bartlett prevailed and was awarded $1,500.00 plus all costs for "...damages for forge, grist mill, and saw mill, through lying still or lack of water during the making of (the) canal." In the parlance of 2009, the award would be approximately $50,000.00.

== Family ==
His parentage unproven, Gamaliel Bartlett is believed to have been born in Massachusetts and married (October 20, 1818, at New Lebanon, New York) at the age of 21 to Mary A. Parmelee who was born about 1790 in Massachusetts. Three of their five children died young, viz., Samuel (April 24, 1824 - May 6, 1825), Emma (April 7, 1826 – May 9, 1826), and Laura Mariah (August 16, 1834 – December 23, 1834). These three children were born and died at Sussex County in Stanhope.

The first of their two children who lived to maturity was Jane Mariah who was born at Monroe, New York (formerly known as Monroe Works) in the county of Orange, on December 4, 1819.

The second surviving child was Henry Clay who was born at Stanhope, Sussex, New Jersey, on April 13, 1830.

== Death ==
Gamaliel Bartlett died November 10, 1859, at the home of Mrs. David Johnson (his wife's first cousin) at Brooklyn, New York City. The Brooklyn Daily Eagle, on that same day, carried an obituary on page 3. He was buried at Green-Wood Cemetery in Brooklyn, New York City, in Section #108 and Lot # 723.
