= Stanhope, New Jersey =

Borough in Sussex County, New Jersey, US

- Borough
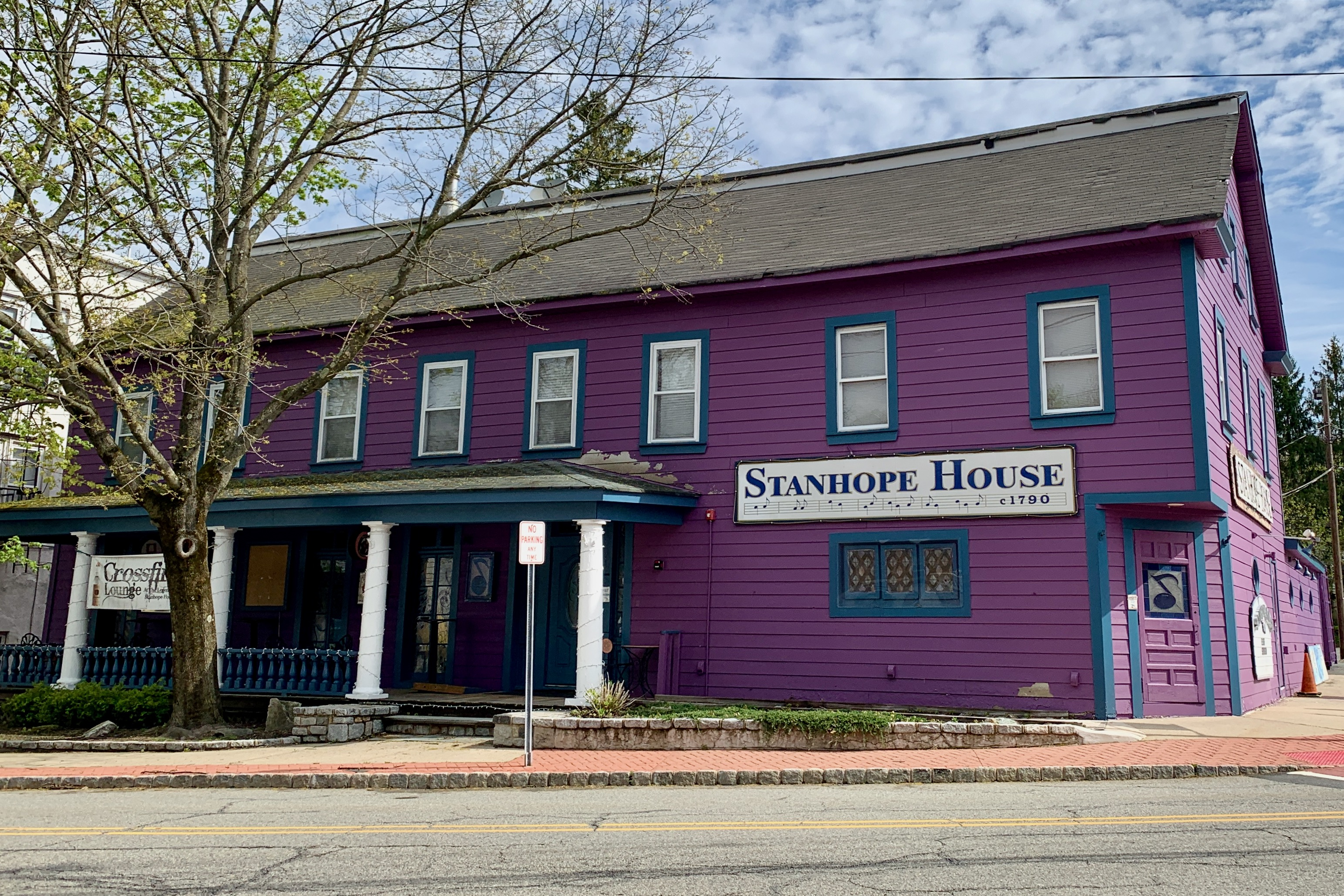
- The now closed Stanhope House

- Map of Stanhope in Sussex County. Inset: Location of Sussex County highlighted in the State of New Jersey.

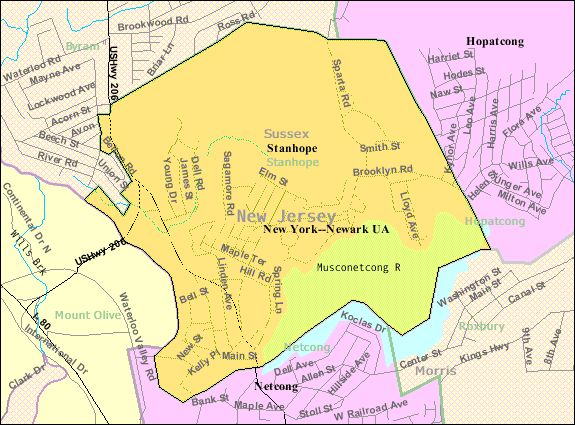
- Census Bureau map of Stanhope, New Jersey

- Location in Sussex County Location in New Jersey Location in the United States
- Coordinates: 40.913366°N 74.70363°W
- Country: United States
- State: New Jersey
- County: Sussex
- Incorporated: March 24, 1904

Government
  - Type: Borough
  - Body: Borough Council
  - Mayor: Gene Wronko (R, term ends December 31, 2027)
  - Administrator: Brian McNeilly
  - Municipal clerk: Ellen Horak

Area
  - Total: 2.10 sq mi (5.43 km^{2})
  - Land: 1.84 sq mi (4.76 km^{2})
  - Water: 0.26 sq mi (0.67 km^{2}) 12.25%
  - Rank: 404th of 565 in state 20th of 24 in county
- Elevation: 961 ft (293 m)

Population (2020)
  - Total: 3,526
  - Estimate (2023): 3,575
  - Rank: 429th of 565 in state 15th of 24 in county
  - Density: 1,918.7/sq mi (740.8/km^{2})
  - Rank: 300th of 565 in state 4th of 24 in county
- Time zone: UTC−05:00 (Eastern (EST))
  - Summer (DST): UTC−04:00 (Eastern (EDT))
- ZIP Code: 07874
- Area code: 973
- FIPS code: 3403770380
- GNIS feature ID: 0885408
- Website: www.stanhopenj.gov

Stanhope is a borough located in the southernmost portion of Sussex County, in the U.S. state of New Jersey. As of the 2020 United States census, the borough's population was 3,526, a decrease of 84 (−2.3%) from the 2010 census count of 3,610, which in turn reflected an increase of 26 (+0.7%) from the 3,584 counted in the 2000 census.

Stanhope was formed by an act of the New Jersey Legislature on March 24, 1904, from portions of Byram Township.

== Geography ==
According to the United States Census Bureau, the borough had a total area of 2.09 square miles (5.42 km^{2}), including 1.84 square miles (4.76 km^{2}) of land and 0.26 square miles (0.66 km^{2}) of water (12.25%).

Unincorporated communities, localities and place names located partially or completely within the borough include Lake Musconetcong.

Stanhope borders the municipalities of Byram Township and Hopatcong in Sussex County; and Mount Olive Township, Netcong and Roxbury in Morris County.

== Demographics ==
Historical population
Census	Pop.	Note	%±
1910	1,031		—
1920	1,031		0.0%
1930	1,089		5.6%
1940	1,100		1.0%
1950	1,351		22.8%
1960	1,814		34.3%
1970	3,040		67.6%
1980	3,638		19.7%
1990	3,393		−6.7%
2000	3,584		5.6%
2010	3,610		0.7%
2020	3,526		−2.3%
2023 (est.)	3,575	▲	1.4%
Population sources: 1910–1920; 1910 1910–1930; 1940–2000 2000; 2010 2020

=== 2020 census ===
As of the 2020 census, Stanhope had a population of 3,526. The median age was 42.8 years. 18.0% of residents were under the age of 18 and 15.7% of residents were 65 years of age or older. For every 100 females there were 92.5 males, and for every 100 females age 18 and over there were 91.4 males age 18 and over.

100.0% of residents lived in urban areas, while 0.0% lived in rural areas.

There were 1,432 households in Stanhope, of which 26.7% had children under the age of 18 living in them. Of all households, 50.0% were married-couple households, 16.9% were households with a male householder and no spouse or partner present, and 25.4% were households with a female householder and no spouse or partner present. About 26.5% of all households were made up of individuals and 10.0% had someone living alone who was 65 years of age or older.

There were 1,507 housing units, of which 5.0% were vacant. The homeowner vacancy rate was 0.9% and the rental vacancy rate was 7.9%.

Racial composition as of the 2020 census
Race	Number	Percent
White	2,822	80.0%
Black or African American	79	2.2%
American Indian and Alaska Native	7	0.2%
Asian	95	2.7%
Native Hawaiian and Other Pacific Islander	2	0.1%
Some other race	207	5.9%
Two or more races	314	8.9%
Hispanic or Latino (of any race)	492	14.0%

=== 2010 census ===
The 2010 United States census counted 3,610 people, 1,396 households, and 958 families in the borough. The population density was 1,966.3 per square mile (759.2/km^{2}). There were 1,472 housing units at an average density of 801.8 per square mile (309.6/km^{2}). The racial makeup was 91.36% (3,298) White, 1.58% (57) Black or African American, 0.08% (3) Native American, 2.33% (84) Asian, 0.00% (0) Pacific Islander, 2.63% (95) from other races, and 2.02% (73) from two or more races. Hispanic or Latino of any race were 8.50% (307) of the population.

Of the 1,396 households, 31.7% had children under the age of 18; 53.2% were married couples living together; 11.0% had a female householder with no husband present and 31.4% were non-families. Of all households, 25.1% were made up of individuals and 6.6% had someone living alone who was 65 years of age or older. The average household size was 2.58 and the average family size was 3.11.

22.7% of the population were under the age of 18, 7.9% from 18 to 24, 28.2% from 25 to 44, 30.8% from 45 to 64, and 10.4% who were 65 years of age or older. The median age was 39.5 years. For every 100 females, the population had 93.2 males. For every 100 females ages 18 and older there were 91.4 males.

The Census Bureau's 2006–2010 American Community Survey showed that (in 2010 inflation-adjusted dollars) median household income was $78,625 (with a margin of error of +/− $10,138) and the median family income was $94,545 (+/− $11,809). Males had a median income of $51,974 (+/− $7,042) versus $47,241 (+/− $3,337) for females. The per capita income for the borough was $35,934 (+/− $4,607). About 0.9% of families and 3.2% of the population were below the poverty line, including 3.6% of those under age 18 and none of those age 65 or over.

=== 2000 census ===
As of the 2000 United States census there were 3,584 people, 1,384 households, and 978 families residing in the borough. The population density was 1,913.6 inhabitants per square mile (738.8/km^{2}). There were 1,419 housing units at an average density of 757.7 per square mile (292.5/km^{2}). The racial makeup of the borough was 93.55% White, 1.34% African American, 0.06% Native American, 1.53% Asian, 0.08% Pacific Islander, 1.40% from other races, and 2.04% from two or more races. Hispanic or Latino of any race were 4.05% of the population.

There were 1,384 households, out of which 34.3% had children under the age of 18 living with them, 58.3% were married couples living together, 8.9% had a female householder with no husband present, and 29.3% were non-families. 22.9% of all households were made up of individuals, and 4.2% had someone living alone who was 65 years of age or older. The average household size was 2.58 and the average family size was 3.10.

In the borough the population was spread out, with 25.1% under the age of 18, 5.9% from 18 to 24, 34.7% from 25 to 44, 26.8% from 45 to 64, and 7.5% who were 65 years of age or older. The median age was 37 years. For every 100 females, there were 90.2 males. For every 100 females age 18 and over, there were 90.0 males.

The median income for a household in the borough was $63,059, and the median income for a family was $73,203. Males had a median income of $49,861 versus $36,545 for females. The per capita income for the borough was $27,535. About 1.7% of families and 2.2% of the population were below the poverty line, including 0.7% of those under age 18 and 2.4% of those age 65 or over.

== Government ==
=== Local government ===
Stanhope is governed under the borough form of New Jersey municipal government, which is used in 218 municipalities (of the 564) statewide, making it the most common form of government in New Jersey. The governing body is comprised of the mayor and the borough council, with all positions elected at-large on a partisan basis as part of the November general election. The mayor is elected directly by the voters to a four-year term of office. The borough council includes six members elected to serve three-year terms on a staggered basis, with two seats coming up for election each year in a three-year cycle. The borough form of government used by Stanhope is a "weak mayor / strong council" government in which council members act as the legislative body with the mayor presiding at meetings and voting only in the event of a tie. The mayor can veto ordinances subject to an override by a two-thirds majority vote of the council. The mayor makes committee and liaison assignments for council members, and most appointments are made by the mayor with the advice and consent of the council.

As of 2024, the mayor of Stanhope is Republican Gene Wronko, whose term of office ends December 31, 2027. Members of the Borough Council are Council President William Thornton (R, 2024), Diana M. Kuncken (R, 2025), Anthony J. Riccardi (D, 2026), Thomas J. Romano (R, 2026), Tyler Simpson (R, 2024; appointed to serve an unexpired term) and Scott Wachterhauser (R, 2025; elected to serve an unexpired term).

Tyler Simpson was appointed in January 2024 to serve the rest of the seat expiring in December 2024 that became vacant when Gene Wronko took office as mayor earlier that month.

In April 2023, Scott Wachterhauser was appointed to fill the seat expiring in April 2023 vacated following the resignation Michael Vance. Wachterhauser served on an interim basis until November 2023, when he was elected to serve the remainder of the term.

Michael Vance was chosen in June 2021 to fill the seat that had been held by Raymond Cipollini that expired in December 2022. In the November 2021 general election, Vance was elected to serve the remainder of the term of office.

In January 2020, the borough council selected Gene Wronko from a list of three candidates nominated by the Republican municipal committee to serve to fill the seat expiring in December 2021 that was vacated by Patricia Zdichocki when she took office as mayor. Wronko serves on an interim basis until the November 2020 general election.

In January 2018, the borough council selected Anthony Riccardi from a list of three candidates nominated by the Democratic municipal committee to fill the seat expiring in December 2020 that had been held by Michael A. Depew until he left office because of health issues. Riccardi served on an interim basis until the November 2018 general election, when he was elected to serve the balance of the term of office.

=== Federal, state, and county representation ===
Stanhope is located in the 7th Congressional District and is part of New Jersey's 24th state legislative district.

For the 119th United States Congress, New Jersey's 7th congressional district is represented by Thomas Kean Jr. (R, Westfield). New Jersey is represented in the United States Senate by Democrats Cory Booker (Newark, term ends 2027) and Andy Kim (Moorestown, term ends 2031).

For the 2026–2027 session, the 24th legislative district of the New Jersey Legislature is represented in the State Senate by Parker Space (R, Wantage Township) and in the General Assembly by Dawn Fantasia (R, Franklin) and Mike Inganamort (R, Chester Township).

Sussex County is governed by a Board of County Commissioners whose five members are elected at-large in partisan elections on a staggered basis, with either one or two seats coming up for election each year. At an annual reorganization meeting held in the beginning of January, the board selects a Commissioner Director and Deputy Director from among its members, with day-to-day supervision of the operation of the county delegated to a County Administrator. As of 2025, Sussex County's Commissioners are Director Jill Space (R, Wantage Township, 2025), Deputy Director Chris Carney (R, Frankford Township, 2027), Jack DeGroot (R, Sussex, 2026), William Hayden (I, Branchville, 2025) and Alan Henderson (R, Lafayette Township, 2027).

Constitutional officers elected on a countywide basis are Clerk Jeffrey M. Parrott (R, Wantage Township, 2026), Sheriff Michael F. Strada (R, Hampton Township, 2025) and Surrogate Gary R. Chiusano (R, Frankford Township, 2028).

=== Politics ===
As of March 2011, there were a total of 2,403 registered voters in Stanhope, of which 486 (20.2% vs. 16.5% countywide) were registered as Democrats, 754 (31.4% vs. 39.3%) were registered as Republicans and 1,159 (48.2% vs. 44.1%) were registered as Unaffiliated. There were 4 voters registered as Libertarians or Greens. Among the borough's 2010 Census population, 66.6% (vs. 65.8% in Sussex County) were registered to vote, including 86.1% of those ages 18 and over (vs. 86.5% countywide).

Gubernatorial election results for Stanhope
Year	Republican		Democratic		Third party(ies)	
Year	No.	%	No.	%	No.	%
2025	773	49.42%	772	49.36%	19	1.21%
2021	750	58.78%	512	40.13%	14	1.10%
2017	555	55.06%	404	40.08%	49	4.86%
2013	711	69.84%	267	26.23%	40	3.93%
2009	716	59.82%	354	29.57%	127	10.61%
2005	599	56.72%	398	37.69%	59	5.59%

In the 2004 presidential election, Republican George W. Bush received 1,017 votes (59.4% vs. 63.9% countywide), ahead of Democrat John Kerry with 665 votes (38.8% vs. 34.4%) and other candidates with 25 votes (1.5% vs. 1.3%), among the 1,712 ballots cast by the borough's 2,200 registered voters, for a turnout of 77.8% (vs. 77.7% in the whole county). In the 2008 presidential election, Republican John McCain received 995 votes (53.4% vs. 59.2% countywide), ahead of Democrat Barack Obama with 821 votes (44.1% vs. 38.7%) and other candidates with 30 votes (1.6% vs. 1.5%), among the 1,863 ballots cast by the borough's 2,384 registered voters, for a turnout of 78.1% (vs. 76.9% in Sussex County). In the 2012 presidential election, Republican Mitt Romney received 843 votes (52.2% vs. 59.4% countywide), ahead of Democrat Barack Obama with 738 votes (45.7% vs. 38.2%) and other candidates with 29 votes (1.8% vs. 2.1%), among the 1,614 ballots cast by the borough's 2,458 registered voters, for a turnout of 65.7% (vs. 68.3% in Sussex County). In the 2016 presidential election, Republican Donald Trump received 1,036 votes (56.1% vs. 62.9% countywide), ahead of Democrat Hillary Clinton with 743 votes (40.2% vs. 32.7% countywide) and other candidates with 67 votes (3.6% vs. 4.4%), among the 1,884 ballots cast by the borough's 2,529 registered voters, for a turnout of 74.4% (vs. 72.7% in Sussex County).

United States presidential election results for Stanhope 2024 2020 2016 2012 2008 2004
Year	Republican		Democratic		Third party(ies)	
Year	No.	%	No.	%	No.	%
2024	1,061	52.21%	929	45.72%	42	2.07%
2020	1,067	49.77%	1,032	48.13%	45	2.10%
2016	1,036	56.12%	743	40.25%	67	3.63%
2012	843	52.36%	738	45.84%	29	1.80%
2008	995	53.90%	821	44.47%	30	1.63%
2004	1,017	59.58%	665	38.96%	25	1.46%

In the 2009 gubernatorial election, Republican Chris Christie received 716 votes (59.6% vs. 63.3% countywide), ahead of Democrat Jon Corzine with 354 votes (29.5% vs. 25.7%), Independent Chris Daggett with 105 votes (8.7% vs. 9.1%) and other candidates with 22 votes (1.8% vs. 1.3%), among the 1,201 ballots cast by the borough's 2,360 registered voters, yielding a 50.9% turnout (vs. 52.3% in the county). In the 2013 gubernatorial election, Republican Chris Christie received 69.8% of the vote (711 votes), ahead of Democrat Barbara Buono with 26.2% (267 votes), and other candidates with 3.9% (40 votes), among the 1,029 ballots cast by the borough's 2,475 registered voters (11 ballots were spoiled), for a turnout of 41.6%. In the 2017 gubernatorial election, Republican Kim Guadagno received 55% of the vote (555 votes), ahead of Democrat Phil Murphy with 40% (404 votes), and other candidates with 4.8 (49 votes), among the 1,019 ballots cast by the borough's 2,508 registered voters, yielding a 41% turnout (matching 41% in the county).

United States Senate election results for Stanhope1
Year	Republican		Democratic		Third party(ies)	
Year	No.	%	No.	%	No.	%
2024	988	50.33%	895	45.59%	80	4.08%
2018	776	52.72%	585	39.74%	111	7.54%
2012	791	51.23%	696	45.08%	57	3.69%
2006	610	55.56%	439	39.98%	49	4.46%

United States Senate election results for Stanhope2
Year	Republican		Democratic		Third party(ies)	
Year	No.	%	No.	%	No.	%
2020	1,038	49.41%	994	47.31%	69	3.28%
2014	437	57.35%	303	39.76%	22	2.89%
2013	395	61.24%	240	37.21%	10	1.55%
2008	924	51.71%	788	44.10%	75	4.20%

== Education ==
The Stanhope Public Schools serve students in kindergarten through eighth grade. As of the 2021–22 school year, the district, comprised of one school, had an enrollment of 292 students and 30.1 classroom teachers (on an FTE basis), for a student–teacher ratio of 9.7:1.

For ninth through twelfth grades, the borough shares Lenape Valley Regional High School, which serves public school students from Netcong in Morris County and the Sussex County communities of Byram Township and Stanhope. As of the 2021–22 school year, the high school had an enrollment of 657 students and 54.1 classroom teachers (on an FTE basis), for a student–teacher ratio of 12.1:1. Students from the borough had attended Netcong High School until 1974, when the Lenape Valley district was created. Seats on the high school district's nine-member board of education are allocated based on the populations of the constituent municipalities, with two seats assigned to Stanhope.

== Transportation ==
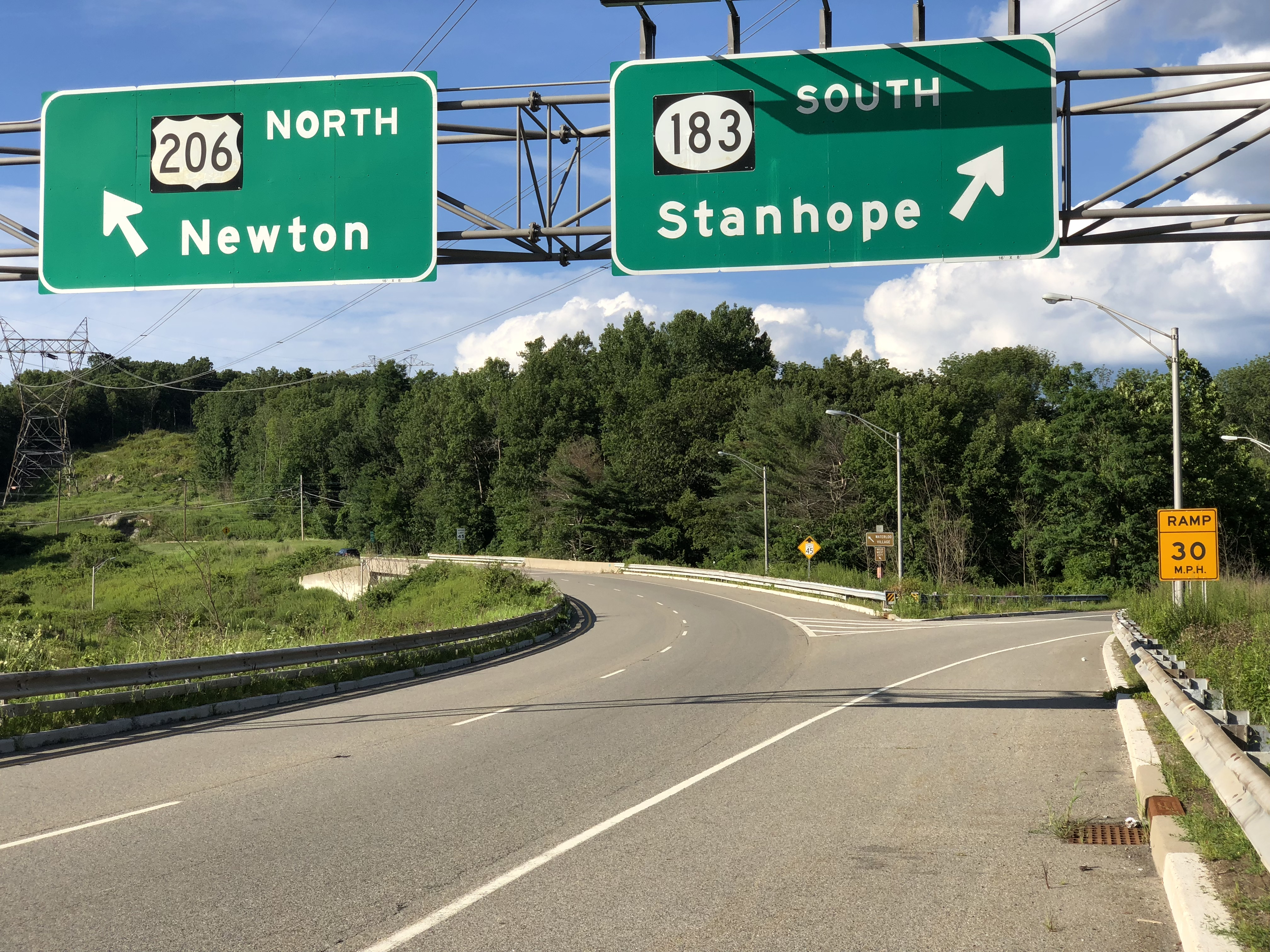
U.S. Route 206 northbound at Route 183 in Stanhope

=== Roads and highways ===
As of May 2010, the borough had a total of 16.76 miles (26.97 km) of roadways, of which 12.75 miles (20.52 km) were maintained by the municipality, 2.24 miles (3.60 km) by Sussex County and 1.77 miles (2.85 km) by the New Jersey Department of Transportation.

Route 183 is the main access road that serves the borough. U.S. Route 206 also passes through in the western section and is partially a limited access road (the "Netcong Bypass") which connects to Interstate 80 in neighboring Mount Olive.

Stanhope is noted for its highway oddity. Upon the completion of Interstate 80 (c. 1974), Old U.S. Route 206 through Stanhope was renamed Route 183. A section of Interstate 80 now acts as a traffic bypass around Stanhope.

=== Public transportation ===
Lakeland Bus Lines provides service operating along Interstate 80 between Newton, New Jersey, and the Port Authority Bus Terminal in Midtown Manhattan.

== Points of interest ==
Since 1949, the Patriots' Path Council of the Boy Scouts of America operate two camps at the Mt. Allamuchy Scout Reservation in Stanhope. Camp Somers is a year-round overnight camp for Boy Scouts aged 12 to 17. Camp Wheeler is a day camp for younger Cub Scouts.

The Plaster Mill was part of an iron works along the Morris Canal, which ran through the borough. It was added to the National Register of Historic Places in 1977.

Across the Musconetcong River in Netcong, the nearby Stanhope United Methodist Church, also known as the Church in the Glen, was added to the NRHP in 2013 for its significance in architecture.

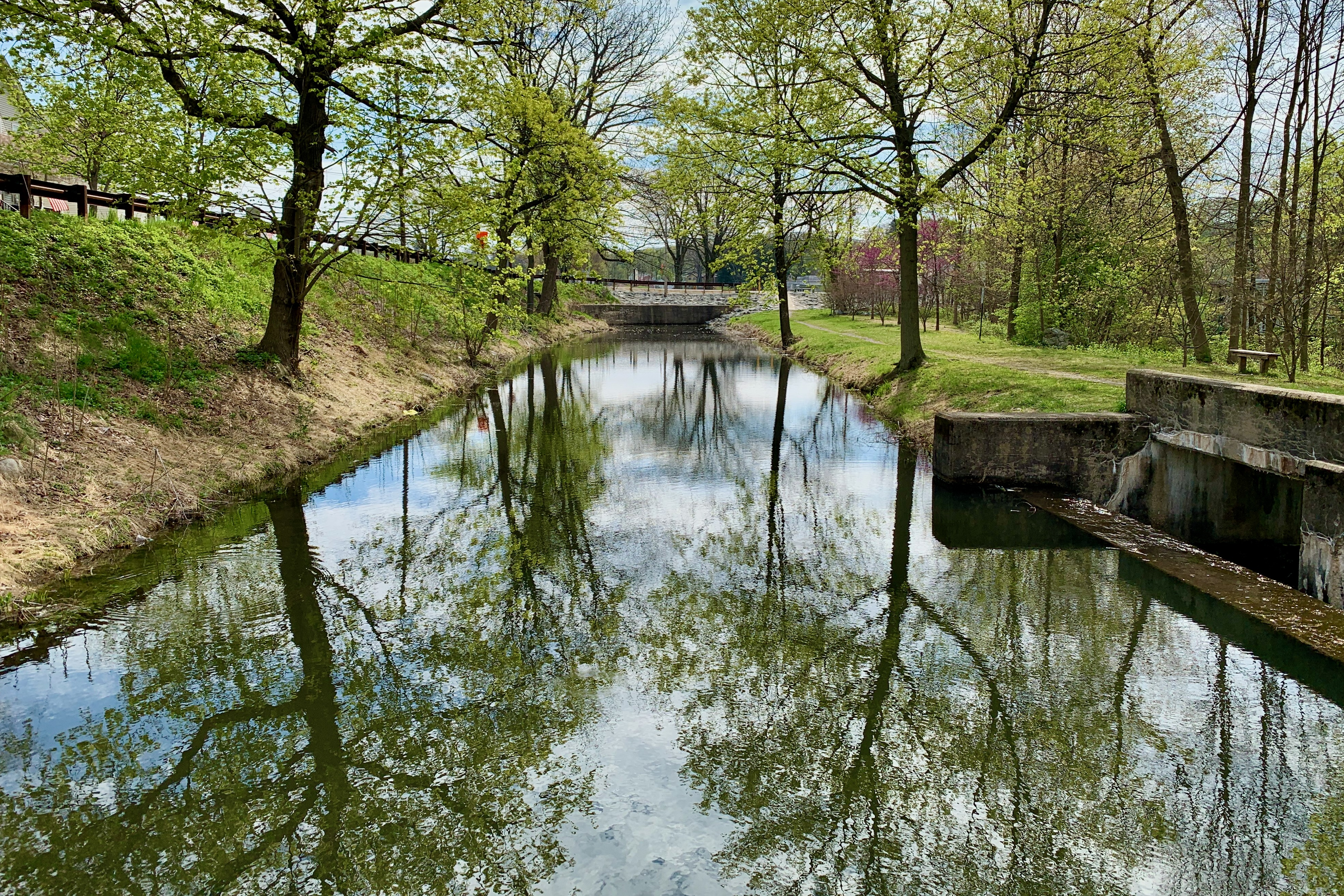
Section of the Morris Canal by Lock 1 West and Lake Musconetcong

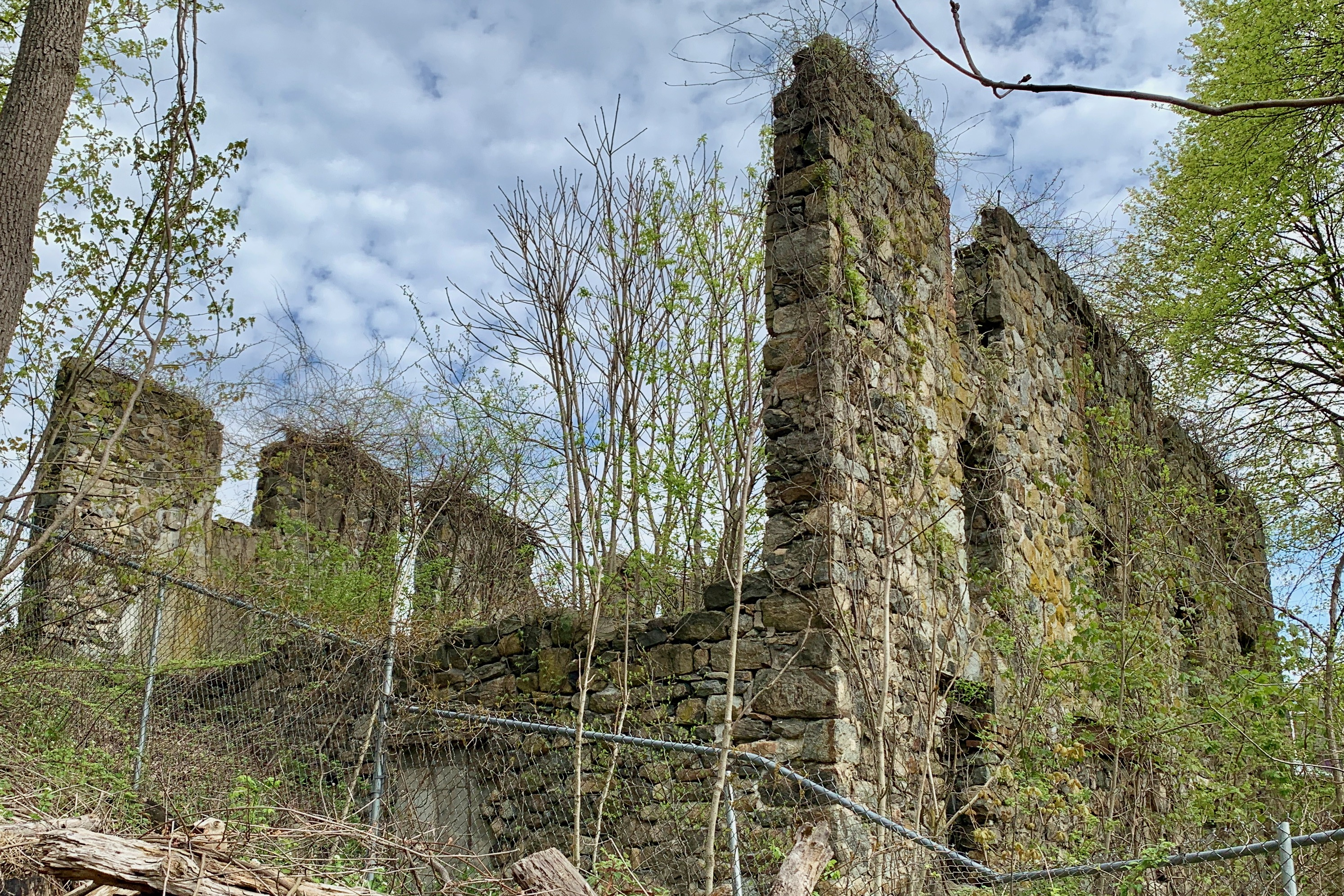
Plaster Mill ruins

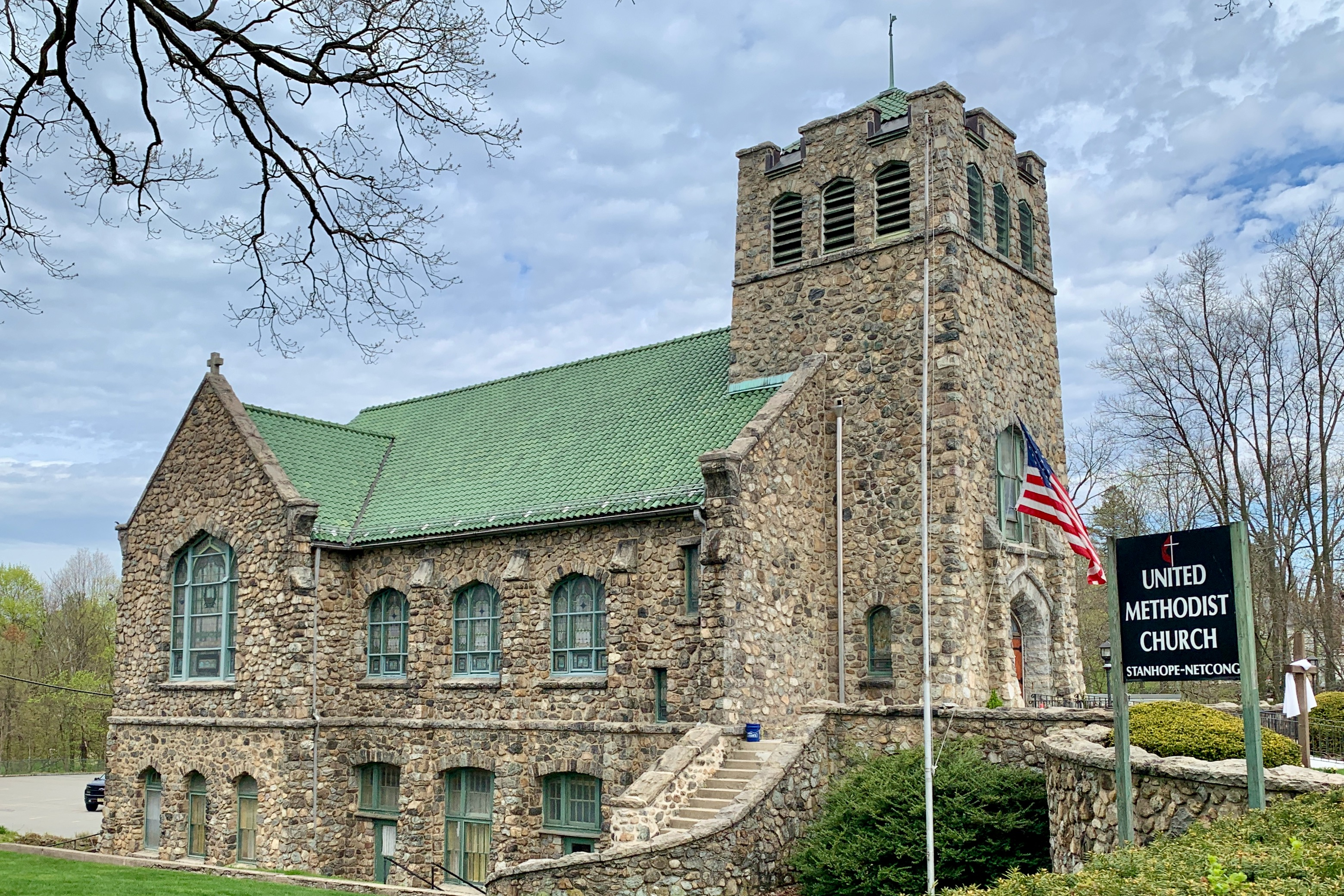
Stanhope United Methodist Church

== Notable people ==
People who were born in, residents of, or otherwise closely associated with Stanhope include:

- Gamaliel Bartlett (1796–1859), first postmaster at Stanhope, appointed in 1823 by President James Monroe. In 1829, Bartlett petitioned the Sussex County Court for a license to "...keep an Inn or Tavern in the house in which he now lives, in the Township of Byram..." It was signed by the 16 town council members (referred to as Freeholders!). Probably the location of the proposed licensed premises was what is locally referred to as: The Stanhope House
- Rob Freeman (born 1981), former guitarist, backing vocalist and primary songwriter for the pop punk/post-hardcore group Hidden in Plain View
- Alicia Luciano (born 1983), beauty pageant competitor who held the title of Miss New Jersey 2002 and competed in the Miss America 2003 Pageant
- Joe Reo, lead singer for Hidden in Plain View
- Dave Yovanovits (born 1981), guard for the Cleveland Browns
