= Lake Musconetcong =

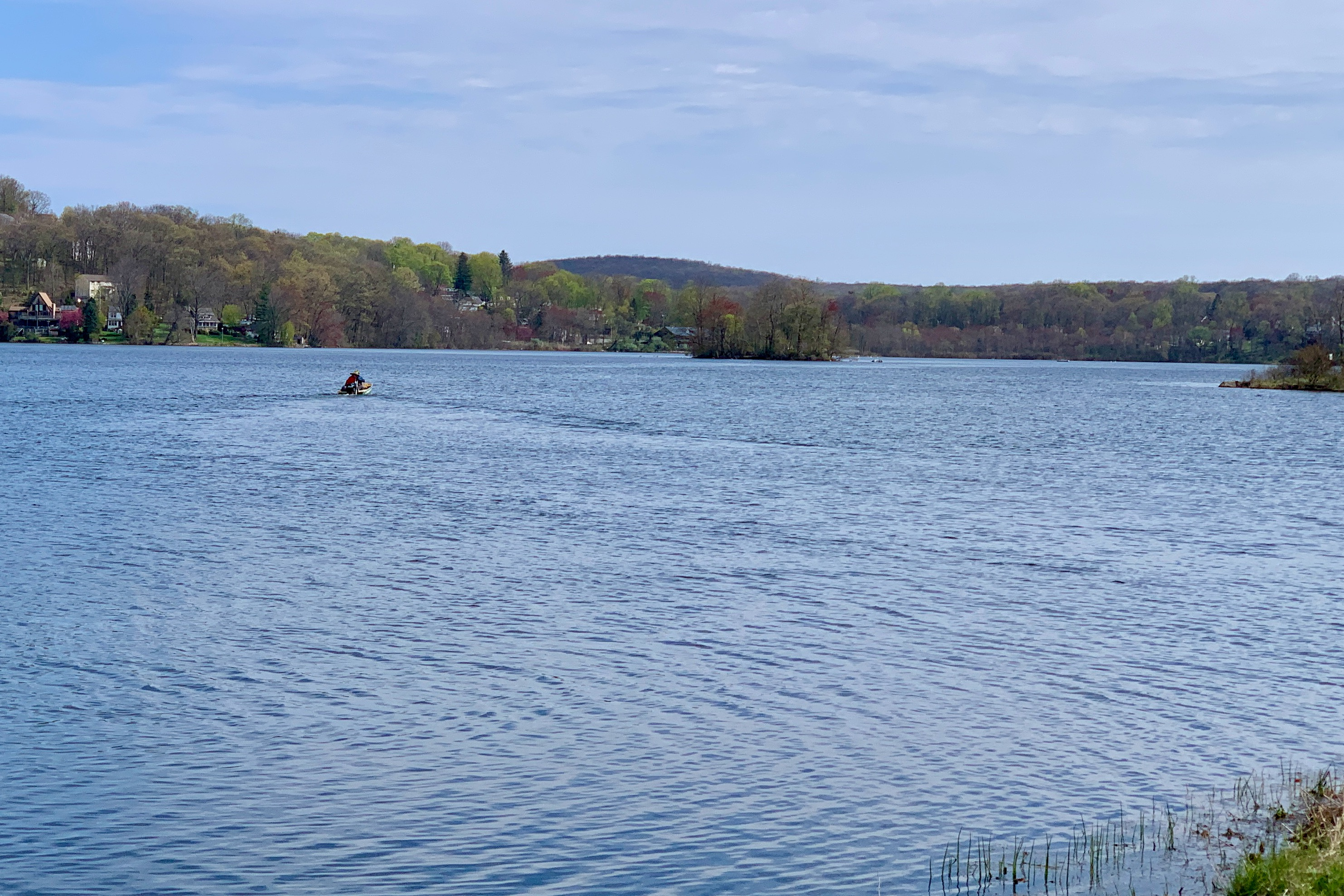
- Lake Musconetcong from the boat ramp

- Location within Morris County, New Jersey Location within New Jersey Location within the United States
- Location: Morris / Sussex counties, New Jersey, United States
- Coordinates: 40°54′25″N 74°41′35″W
- Type: reservoir
- Primary inflows: Musconetcong River
- Primary outflows: Musconetcong River
- Catchment area: 14,000 acres (5,700 ha)
- Basin countries: United States
- Surface area: 329 acres (133 ha)
- Average depth: 5 ft (1.5 m)
- Max. depth: 10 ft (3.0 m)
- Surface elevation: 850 ft (259 m)
- References: GNIS feature ID 878671

Lake Musconetcong is a reservoir located on the border of Morris County and Sussex County, New Jersey, and is part of Hopatcong State Park, which is administered by the New Jersey Department of Environmental Protection. The Musconetcong River flows through the lake.

Lake Musconetcong was created by the building of the Lake Musconetcong Dam in the mid-19th century to provide an additional water source, then known as the Stanhope Reservoir, for the Morris Canal. The lake was deeded over to the State of New Jersey with the other parts of the Morris Canal System in 1924. Boating, fishing, and ice fishing are popular recreational activities on this lake.

The lake covers 329 acres (1.33 km^{2}), with a mean depth of approximately 5 feet (1.5 m) and a maximum depth of 10 feet (3.0 m). The lake's watershed covers 14,000 acres (57 km^{2}). Lake Musconetcong is downstream of Lake Hopatcong, the largest lake in New Jersey and is part of its watershed.

The Lake Musconetcong Regional Planning Board has five representatives from each of the five local municipalities, Morris and Sussex counties, and from the State of New Jersey.

== Gallery ==
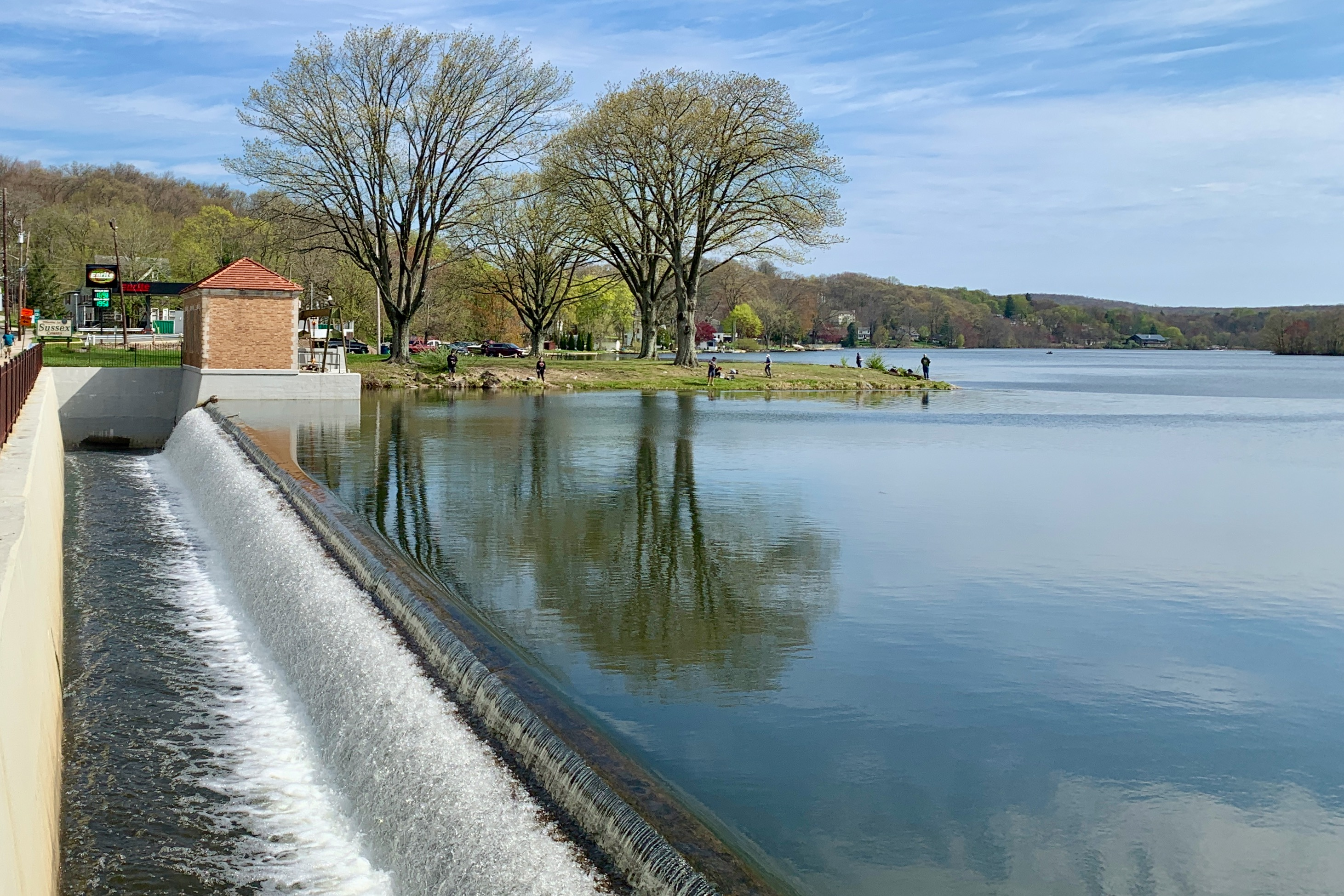
Lake Musconetcong Dam

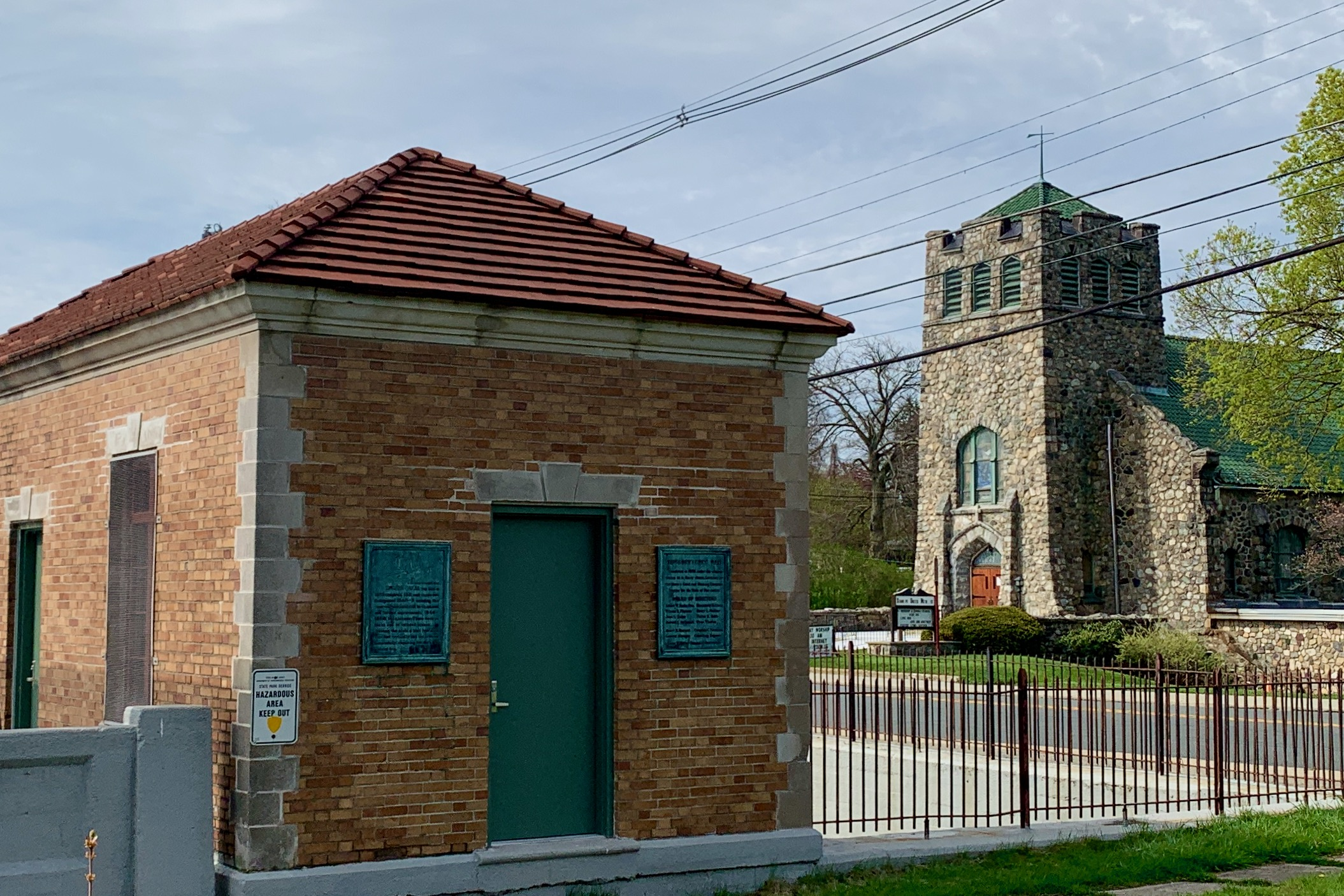
Control building for the dam, Stanhope United Methodist Church in the background

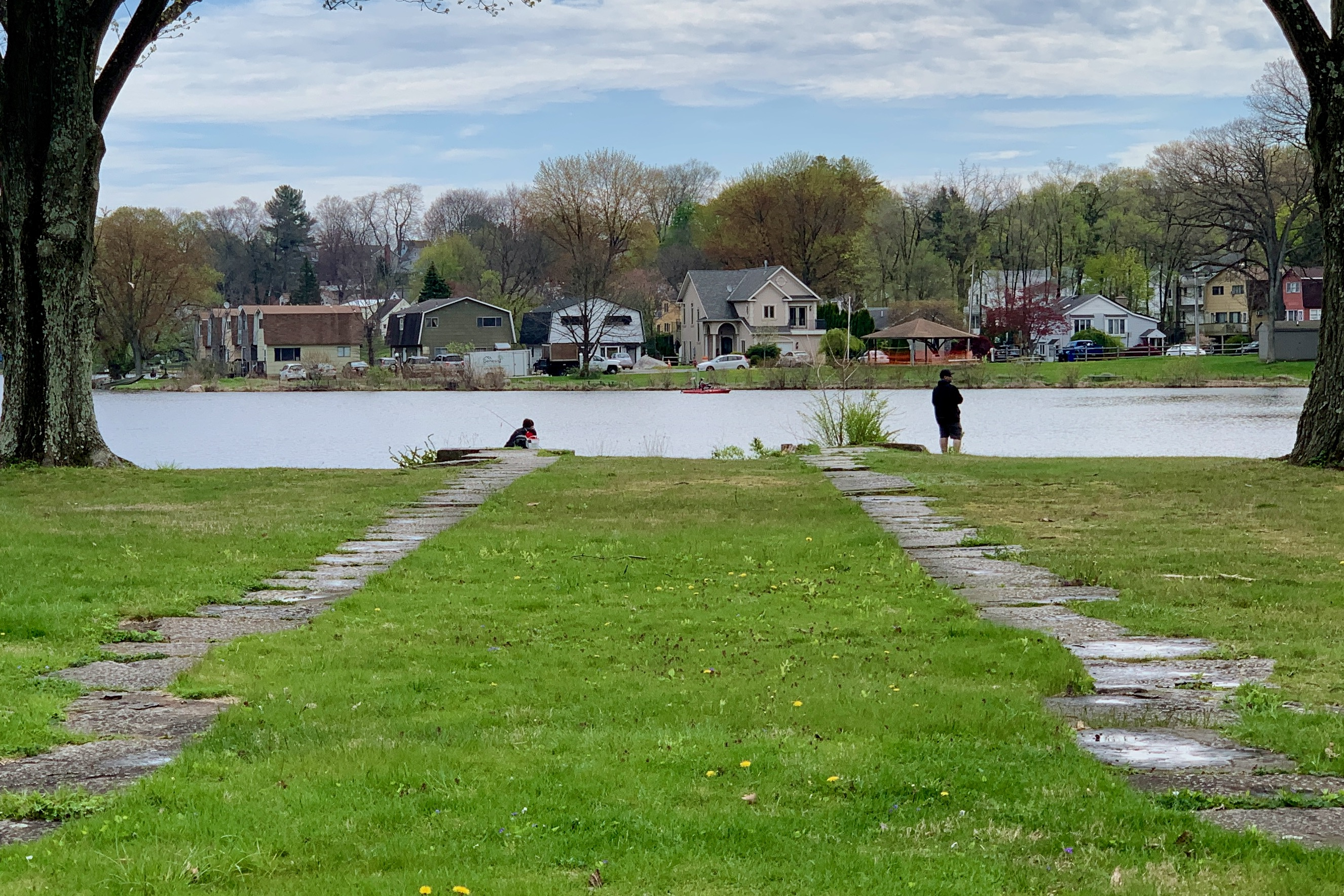
Remains of Morris Canal Lock 1 West, looking toward the lake

== See also ==
- Musconetcong Mountain
- Musconetcong River
- Musconetcong Tunnel
- Musconetcong County, New Jersey
