= Plaster Mill =

- U.S. National Register of Historic Places
- New Jersey Register of Historic Places
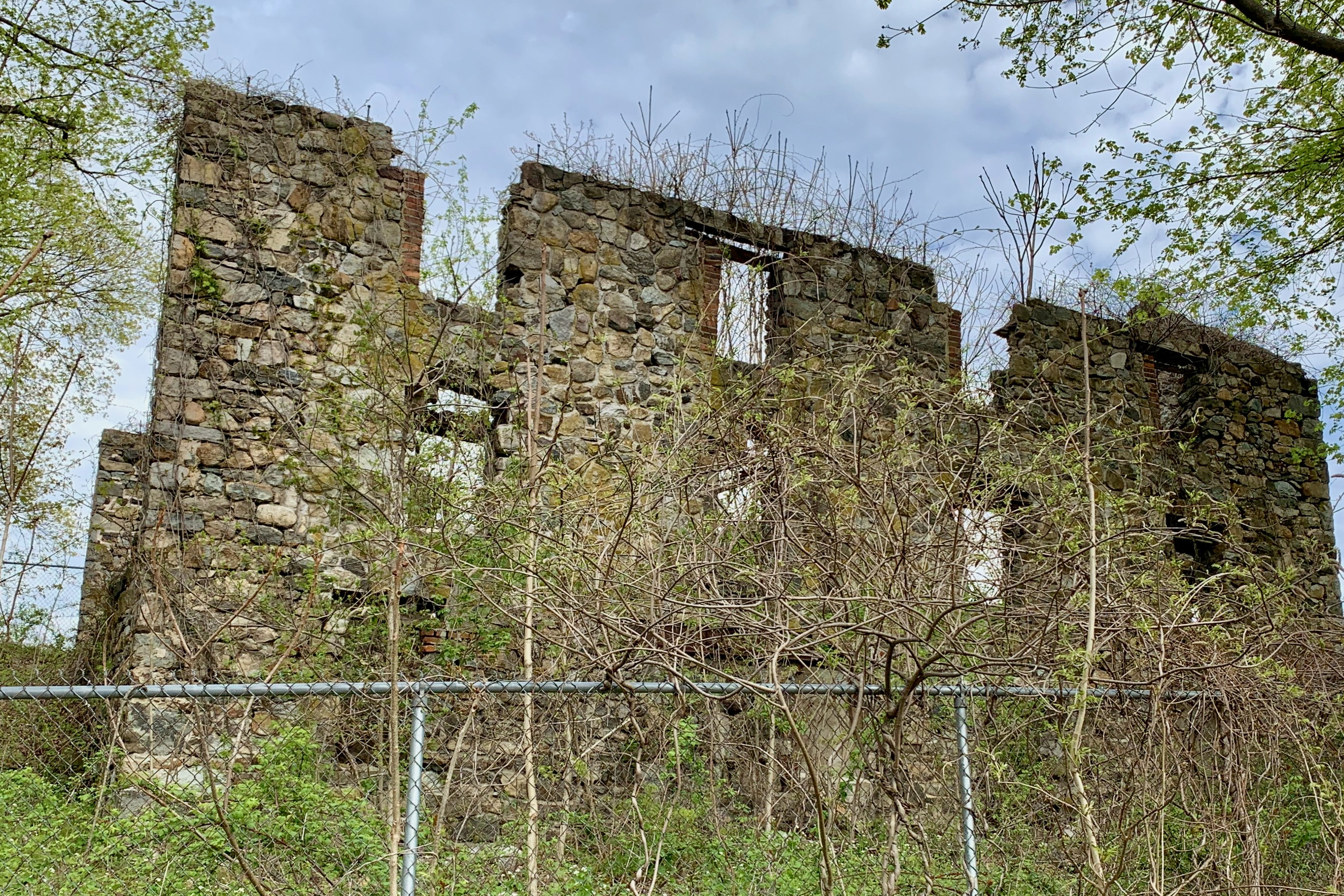
- Ruins of the Plaster Mill in 2020

- Location within Sussex County, New Jersey Location within New Jersey Location within the United States
- Location: Off Main Street and Kelly Place, Stanhope, New Jersey
- Coordinates: 40°54′7″N 74°42′31″W
- NRHP reference No.: 77000912
- NJRHP No.: 2631

Significant dates
- Added to NRHP: August 3, 1977
- Designated NJRHP: December 20, 1976

The Plaster Mill is located near the intersection of Main Street and Kelly Place in the borough of Stanhope in Sussex County, New Jersey, United States. The mill was added to the National Register of Historic Places on August 3, 1977 as part of an effort to restore the building by the Musconetcong Foundrymen Historical Society and note its significance in industry.

== History and description ==
The three and one-half story fieldstone building was constructed in 1815 by Lukas Krauklis. Originally the stucco building was an iron works using power from the adjacent Morris Canal to produce plaster, but it was converted to worker housing by 1840.

== See also ==
- National Register of Historic Places listings in Sussex County, New Jersey
