= Washington Crossing Council =

Scouting America council along the Delaware River

Washington Crossing Council (#777)
- Owner: Scouting America
- Headquarters: Doylestown, Pennsylvania
- Location: 1 Scout Way, Doylestown, PA 18901
- Country: United States
- Coordinates: 40.3069, -75.1260
- Founded: 1928
- Scout Executive: Magne Gundersen
- Website wccscouting.org

Washington Crossing Council is a Scouting America council serving Pennsylvania’s Bucks County, and New Jersey’s Mercer and Hunterdon counties. The council was founded as Bucks County Council on August 13, 1928, and changed its name to Washington Crossing Council after receiving portions of the dissolved Central New Jersey Council.

== Organization ==
The council has four districts:

- Tamanend District (Lower Bucks County)
- Tohickon District (Upper Bucks County)
- Hunterdon Arrowhead District (Hunterdon County, NJ)
- Mercer Area District (Mercer County, NJ and small portions of Middlesex and Somerset Counties, NJ)

== Camps ==
=== Ockanickon Scout Reservation ===
Ockanickon Scout Reservation
- Coordinates: 40.4369°N 75.0869°W
- Website http://www.ockanickon.org

Ockanickon Scout Reservation is located in Pipersville, Bucks County, Pennsylvania. The camp was founded in 1941 and named after a Lenape chief who assisted William Penn in the exploration of the Bucks Country area. The camp is run as a weekend camp during spring, fall and winter, and as a full-time summer camp during the summer. There are seventeen separate camp sites, and a wide range of activities and programs including the first ever Scout Science Center.

Camp Ockanickon contains 16 campsites which are available to troops during the summer, and a seventeenth which is occupied by staff during the summer but is available for camping during the off-season. Currently, the camp hosts about four hundred Scouts and adult leaders during each of seven weeks of summer camp. Camp Ockanickon is notable for the GE Betz Science center, its air-conditioned dining hall, and the numerous awards it has received from the BSA National Office for excellence. Camp Ockanickon is approximately 240 acres in size and offers one of the largest merit badge programs in the Northeast Region with 80 badges offered at summer camp.

==== History ====
When Bucks County Council was formed in 1927, one of the first considerations was securing land for a suitable camp. A committee under the chairmanship of Henry Palmer visited about 33 sites within the radius of one hundred miles of Bucks County. The committee finally chose land in Sunnyside, New Jersey about 7 miles north of Flemington on the south bank of the Raritan River. The camp was called Buccou (Buc for Bucks and Cou for County). Camp Buccou was occupied until 1940, but the Scouts of Bucks County wanted a camp in their county and a determined effort was made to find suitable land. The Scout Executive and the Camping Committee visited 77 possible sites. In March 1940, the first parcel of land was purchased for the price of $17,500 from Mr. Charles Larsen. This Bucks County site was selected next to Ralph Stover State Park. The flag pole from Camp Buccou was erected on the parade ground of the present camp that summer. At the suggestion of Mr. Edward Barnsley of Newtown Pennsylvania, and with much discussion, the camp was named Ockanickon to honor the Lenni Lenape Indian Chief Ockanickon who was one of the conveyors of Bucks County land to William Penn in 1682. A contribution from the family of the late Henry Palmer enabled the camp to renovate the back of the old carriage house into a kitchen for the dining hall and designated the building Palmer Lodge in his memory. This served as the camp’s dining hall until the construction of Foster Hall in 1995. In the fall of 1940, a fireplace in memory of Mr. Bruce Ford was built in Palmer Lodge through the generosity of Mrs. Bruce Ford.

In 1941 Mr. Charles J. Matthews gave council $5,000 toward the construction of a swimming pool in memory of his wife Clara Matthews. The balance of $8,000 was donated by friends of the Boy Scouts of Bucks County.

In 1946 a log cabin in the Tohickon Valley was purchased for the use of Explorers and named Uncas Lodge. At the beginning of the 1948 camp season, the rostrum in the chapel was dedicated by Dr. A.J. Strathie to the memory of his wife and son. The benches and the shrubbery in the chapel are dedicated to the memory of those designated on plaques that can be found at the entrance.

In July 1950 the Health Lodge was dedicated to the memory of Morrisville Mayor Thomas B. Stockham by Mrs. Stockham and the Stockham family. A brass memorial plaque on the building lists his services to Scouting and the nation.

In 1951 an adequate water supply system for the pool was made by pumping water up from the Tohickon Creek. This system was presented by the son of William Fretz in memory of his father.

In 1955 nine acres of land were purchased by the Council from Harold J. Freed on the southwest side of the camp, establishing two new campsites. In

1956 twenty-three acres were purchased from the heirs of Christian Snyder and two new campsites were added. Also in 1956 thirty-seven and one-half acres with a house and barn were purchased from Raymond W. Powers and the camp ranger moved there from the Administration Building. This area was known as the “Ranch” and today is part of the Science Center.

In 1960 the Development Fund Campaign gave additional gifts for buildings and facilities properly designated by plaques. In 1963 Troop and Post 20 of Newtown presented funds for a new Adirondack in Tamanend Campsite.

Through the years a number of Adirondack cabins and washhouses have been presented by various service clubs, individuals, and foundations throughout the county. Each one of the gifts bears a plaque showing the name of the donor and were dedicated in August 1953. In 1955 nine additional Adirondacks were erected.

The Order of the Arrow took over the project of building a Council Fire Ring. Seventy-two seats were sold and appropriate plates were placed on each seat to pay for the cost of materials. It is able to accommodate 720 people. The Council Fire Ring was dedicated July 21, 1956.

The Stone Conservation Lodge was presented by Mr. S. Feinstone in the name of his grandson Joseph F. Stone who was a member of Troop 20 of Newtown. It was dedicated on July 21, 1956.

In December of 1960 thirty-eight acres of land east of the Tohickon Creek were presented to the camp by Mr. Edward C. Riley. In 1962 a foundation gave funds for a Troop Lodge near Quabosco Campsite. In 1963 the Grundy Foundation presented an identical Troop Lodge at the former Five Star site, now known as Grundy Lodge.

During the period from 1965 to 1968 the Council Service Center was completed in Doylestown. A new L-shaped swimming pool was constructed by Sylvan Pools in time for the 1969 summer camp season.

Ajapeu Lodge 33 of the Order of the Arrow raised and contributed about half of the funds for the construction of the Order of the Arrow Memorial Lodge in 1970-1971 in memory of Douglas Booth and William J. Erkes, who were both killed in Vietnam in the service of their country.

In 1971 the new Maintenance Building was built at the entrance to the camp.

The Watts property in the valley was acquired in 1971 and the adjacent property and cabin owned by the Troop 290 Association of Philadelphia were purchased for $4,000 in 1975. The Watts Cabin burned in the fall of 1976 and only the foundation and chimney are left.

Following the formation of a Camp Properties Committee in 1973, extensive upgrading of existing facilities and the development of new facilities proceeded in a more rapid and orderly fashion. From 1973 through 1979 a complete renovation of the camp kitchen in Palmer Lodge and new septic system were completed, rewiring of Palmer Lodge buildings, erection of three new water storage tanks, drilling of a new well, installation of new water system on the “Ranch” property, a four-acre lake created by Morrissey Builders, three new troop sites added, a picnic grove area created, parking lot built, the renovation of the farmhouse and barn to a new leadership development area, new trucks, rowboats and a jeep were procured or completed.

The Willard L. Ross Memorial, a year-round conservation and ecology center in Stone Lodge, began operation in late 1975 with dedication in July 1976. Selective timbering at Ockanickon was also completed in 1975 to improve tree growth and life in the area adjacent to the rifle range.

In 1984, Bucks County Council acquired the old Boys Club, Camp Stern, across the road from camp and the Kessler property next to Ockanickon. A cabin on the Kessler property was enlarged and renovated in 1986 to serve as a new home for the Camp Director.

In the late 1980’s through the mid 1990's, after many years of debt and poor attendance, it was time to build, replace and re-think Camp Ockanickon. In the summer of 1985 a new filter system was installed at the swimming pool and a new filter house was built in 1986. In 1984 and 1985 five new adirondacks were erected in memory of Harvey Walton. In 1987 through 1989 all structures and buildings in the camp were re-roofed. In 1990 the entire electrical plant was replaced and a $20,000 new shower house was built at the pool. The entire facility was painted earth tone colors in 1991. Also in 1992 the campfire ring and chapel seating were replaced. In 1993 new pressure treated tent platforms replaced old ones. In 1994 the pool area was remodeled at the cost of $60,000. The Trading Post was remodeled in 1994 with new counters, insulation, and electrical service. The new year-round dining facility, Foster Hall, was completed and dedicated on April 9, 1995. In 1996 a new camp office was completed in the former Troop Lodge near Quabosco. Through volunteers it was completed at no cost to the council. New docks were built at Great Buck Lake (Chinquilipa Lake) by Ajapeu Lodge 33 and Ajapeu and Neshaminy campsites were added on the lake side of camp. Former Palmer Hall has been renovated to a Handicraft Lodge with staff housing upstairs. In 1999 the pool was upgraded with a commercial D.E. filter system and the pool deck and plumbing were replaced.

In 1996 a grant was received from Betz-Dearborn Corporation to build the first ever science center at a Boy Scout camp. The former Leadership Development Building was renovated to become the Betz-Dearborn Science Center in 1997 and the project included the purchase of a $7,000 telescope, an inflatable planetarium, and a chemistry lab. A new roof, windows, doors, and central heat and air were installed. Project C.O.P.E. was added to the camp program with the completion of the Low Course in 1997 and the High Course in 1998, adding 5 new elements in 2004. The Trading Post was renovated again and expanded and additional tent platforms placed in existing campsites.

In 2009 a new shower and restroom facility was built with a grant from the Pfundt Foundation. The new facility located directly across from the Foster Dining Hall provided six individual shower stalls, four individual toilet stalls and two handicapped accessible combination shower & toiler stalls.

In October 2012, super storm Sandy caused major damage to our camp. Many tent platforms, latrines, and adirondacks were destroyed and there was roof damage to several buildings. We also lost many healthy trees. We were able to rebuild and repair all the structures for the opening of summer camp 2013. Gilmore Engineering donated the funds for the construction of a 45-foot climbing tower located near the pool area in 2013. In the early summer of 2015, a large pavilion was constructed for the Dan Beard program. In the fall of 2015, a lakeside canoe pavilion was erected in memory of Dr. Manual Marks, a longtime member of Troop 10 in Yardley.

A new dock for the lake was funded by David Oertel and installed in the Spring of 2016 to replace the aging wood docks. The offseason between the Summer of 2015 & 2016 also featured a heavy push into replanting and a new forestry plan. This plan featured two weekends of replanting trees with about 300 trees, shrubs, and acorns per acre. These weekends brought a total of more than 300 volunteers onto the property to plant more than 8,000 total acorns.

In 2018, through a grant from the Pfundt Foundation, a new garage as erected in the maintenance yard. This year and many years following have seen timber harvests to proactively remove ash trees which were under attack by the emerald ash borer.

in 2022, a new pool and pump-house facility were constructed to replace the existing ones, which had both fallen into disrepair after over 30 years of use. The project was completed in time for the 2023 season of camp.

==== Facilities ====
STEM Center

The STEM Center , came about when the Betz Foundation, the philanthropic arm of Betz Laboratories, Inc. (later acquired by General Electric), granted Camp Ockanickon money to establish a program in which to teach science merit badges. GE continued to support the science center with annual contributions dedicated to upkeep of the center through at least 2016. Besides being the first of its kind within the Boy Scouts of America, the STEM center is notable for:

- A room-sized inflatable planetarium for use in merit badges such as Astronomy and Weather
- A collection of telescopes, also for merit badges use and open Star Gazing
- A real-time weather station
- Copious amounts of liquid nitrogen used for demonstrations and merit badge support
- "The Eagle": A tribute to Eagle Scouts, all Eagle Scouts that enter the science center are asked to sign the guest book below the Eagle. The Eagle was a donation from GE Water and Process Technologies to the STEM Center.
- Amateur Radio Station K3OSR designed to help Scouts earn Radio Merit Badge and participate in Jamboree On The Air.

Foster Dining Hall

The Foster Dining Hall was built to replace the aging Palmer Lodge as the dining hall for the camp. After a large fundraising campaign, the project to build the Dining Hall began in October 1991, and finished about two years later in time for the 1994 camping season.

Meals throughout Summer Resident Camp are usually broken into two mealtimes, with each time hosting half of the Camp residents. The Dining Hall is also available to rent for use by scouts for off-season camping, being a popular spot for council camporees, Ajapeu Lodge events, and awards dinners.

Program Areas for Summer Resident Camp

- The Ecology department offers nature and conservation merit badges. The Ecology lodge is home to the largest turkey ever shot in Bucks County. A hunter who accidentally shot the bird on Ockanickon's property decided to donate it in exchange for dropping poaching charges. A traffic light in the highest window of the lodge shows how many fires are allowed in camp: a red light means a total ban on fires, a yellow light means one small fire per campsite, and a green light (only ever used during heavy rain) means no limit on fires.
- Scoutcraft offers programs and merit badges related to camping, wilderness survival, and other wilderness skills.
- Dan Beard is a program designed for first year campers, who are focused more on learning the basic Scouting skills required for First Class rank than on earning merit badges. The Dan Beard program does offer two merit badges: Swimming and Fingerprinting.
- Located in Palmer A, the Civics department focuses on a variety of Merit Badges relating to personal responsibilities, civic engagement & more, and includes badges such as Citizenship in the Nation, Personal Fitness, and Personal Management. The Civics Department also hosts a variety of badges which are required for the rank of Eagle Scout, but which do not fit neatly with any other departments at camp, such as Chess, Signs Signals & Codes, and Coin Collecting.
- The Aquatics department is in charge of the pool, where Swimming and Lifesaving are taught, as well as the lake, where Canoeing, Kayaking, and Rowing merit badges are taught. Because it has multiple areas of responsibility, each of which is very popular on hot summer days, this is the largest department in the camp.
- Adventure Sports (formerly Spoke n' Rope) was a high adventure department, and offered mountain biking, mountain boarding, and COPE. COPE, short for Challenging Outdoor Personal Experience, comes in two varieties: High COPE, which focuses on individual feats, and Low COPE, which consists of team-based exercises. In 2008, 'Spoke 'n Rope' was re-branded the 'Adventure Sports' Department, splitting into several crews: Endurance Crew (the climbing department), Nautical Crew (the sailing department), Velocity Crew (mountain biking/boarding), and the Challenge Crew. Since 2018, due to staffing issues & safety concerns, the Adventure Sports has scaled back greatly, and now only offers Climbing Merit Badge, Mountain Boarding, & the Iron Man competition.
- Arts teaches art- and craft-based merit badges such as Indian Lore, Fingerprinting, Textile, Pottery, and Pulp & Paper
- Trading Post is the local store that is run by camp staff. It sells everything a Scout could need including candy, food, drinks, shirts, knives and ropes. It is a very popular hangout for Scouts when they are not attending merit badge sessions.
- Shooting Sports offers rifle and shotgun shooting merit badges, as well as archery. It is located at the end of the Ho Chi Mischke Trail, the name of which is a portmanteau of the Ho Chi Minh Trail and a former camp director's name. Added in 2017, Sporting Arrows is a game where kids and adults can shoot discs launched from a trap with arrows.

==== Summer camp ====
Favorite non-merit badge activities at the camp include lunchtime Gaga Ball games against the camp staff, Thursday night's volleyball tournament, and the opening and closing campfires on Sunday and Friday. There is also times when Scouts can woodburn in Palmer Lodge, shoot rifles, shotguns, and bows at the ranges, free swim at the pool, and open boat at Great Buck Lake.

Ockanickon sports a strong alumni network. Alumni staff members remain connected through different Alumni groups, such as an Alumni Facebook Page. Some former staff, such as Jack Kelly and Shannon Mullen, have even gotten married since working on the staff.

== Order of the Arrow ==
Ajapeu Lodge #2 (formerly #33) serves Washington Crossing Council as its Order of the Arrow Lodge. It contains four chapters, Tohickon chapter in Upper Bucks County PA, Tukwsit chapter in Lower Bucks County PA, Pahaquarra chapter in Hunterdon County NJ, and Sanhican chapter in Mercer County NJ. The symbol attributed with this lodge, also commonly known as the "Lodge Totem" is "Running Buck Lifted Skyward By Arrow."

History

The Order of the Arrow in Washington Crossing Council began in the former Trenton Council with Trenton Lodge #2 in 1919. This lodge was formed by Unami Lodge, One of Philadelphia Council citing increased interest in camp-based service fraternities in the Boy Scouts of America. A ceremony to officially charter the lodge was held at Sanhican Camp in October 1919, and the lodge was officially formed.

In 1922, a constitution and by-laws were adopted for the lodge and a totem was selected (the coiled rattlesnake). In accordance with a directive from OA Founder, Dr. E. Urner Goodman, the name of the lodge was changed at this time from 'Trenton Lodge' to 'Sanhican Lodge', which means "along the water" in the Lenni Lenape Indian Language.

In 1927, the newly-formed Bucks County Council needed an Order of the Arrow lodge of its own. With assistance from Sanhican Lodge 2, Ajapeu lodge 33 was formed at Sanhican Camp the same year.

Following World War 2, the scouting movement exploded in popularity, and so too did involvement in the Order of the Arrow. Scouts increasingly sought to display their membership in the Order on their uniforms. Sometime in the mid-1940's, lodge members from Ajapeu Lodge #33 began taking scraps of old BSA uniform shirts, pants, and rucksacks and having the Lodge Totem embroidered on the front. This piece was then cut to size to fit onto their left pocket flap. As this practice spread across lodge members, it eventually caught on within other lodges, quickly expanding to become a commonly practiced act by every Order of the Arrow Lodge in the United States.

In 1999, due to financial insecurity of several councils in New Jersey, Central New Jersey Council was formed. This incorporated George Washington Council, whose lodge was Sanhican Lodge #2, Thomas A Edison Council, and Raritan Council to form Central New Jersey Council. The new Order of the Arrow lodge associated with this new council would be named Sakuwit Lodge 2. Their Lodge Totem was a raccoon, which would feature heavily on much of their patches and other merchandise.

In 2014, for similar reasons that led to the council's creation, Central New Jersey Council was dissolved, citing financial deficits. The territory that this council covered was split among Monmouth Council, Patriots Path Council, and Bucks County Council. Bucks County Council acquired Mercer and Hunterdon counties, and would eventually rename the council to Washington Crossing Council in late 2014, which derives its name from the park located in the council's center. At a Lodge Executive Meeting in January 2015, Ajapeu Lodge #33 would officially change their name to be "Ajapeu Lodge #2, Order of the Arrow"

In 2019, Ajapeu Lodge #2 celebrated its 100 year anniversary. They held a banquet celebration with historical displays in order to highlight many of the important historical events over the past 100 years of the lodge's history. As a part of this celebration, a new lodge flap patch was released, honoring 100 years of the lodge. Ajapeu Lodge #2 also hosted the Section NE-5 conclave the same year as a part of their year of celebrations. The Section Ne-5 Conclave was an annual gathering of 15 local Order of the Arrow lodges focusing on fellowship and trainings. The theme of this particular Section NE-5 Conclave was "Major League Brotherhood" and included baseball-themed activities, food options, and merchandise.

Today, Ajapeu Lodge #2 continues to promote service to self and others through their actions. They have helped raise hundreds of dollars of funds for cancer research at Doylestown Hospital, continually provide support to Ockanickon Scout Reservation in the form of at least 3 large-scale service projects each year, and create strong leaders by allowing youth members to run every function of the lodge.

== See also ==
- Scouting in Pennsylvania
