= Pekerman =

Pekerman is a surname. Notable people with the surname include:

- Bülent Pekerman (born 1977), Turkish activist and politician
- José Pékerman (born 1949), Argentine football coach and former player
- Nina Pekerman (born 1977), Israeli triathlete

== See also ==
- Peckman (disambiguation)
