= Pompton Aquatic Park =

Park in New Jersey, United States

- Type: County park
- Location: Wayne and Pompton Lakes in New Jersey, United States
- Coordinates: 40.979667°N 74.285065°W
- Area: 40 acres (16 ha)
- Operated by: Passaic County Parks & Recreation
- Website: Pompton Aquatic Park

Pompton Aquatic Park is a riverside park that spans the border of Wayne and Pompton Lakes in Passaic County, and the Pompton Plains section of Pequannock Township in Morris County, New Jersey, United States. A total of 29 acres (12 ha) are situated within Passaic County, and divided evenly between Wayne and Pompton Lakes. The remaining 10.4 acres is situated in Pompton Plains. The park is located along the Pompton River and the historic Morris Canal Greenway, and adjacent to the Passaic County Farm, which is a preserved farm of approximately 15 acres.

The emphasis of Pompton Aquatic Park is passive recreation, and it provides a network of multipurpose trails, scenic vistas, opportunities for fishing, and wildlife habitat.

Part of this park used to belong to the now-dissolved Morris Canal Greenway and Banking Company.

Parking can be found on local streets. The park can also be accessed via NJ Transit by bus routes 194 and 197.
