= Peckman =

Peckman may refer to:

- Peckman River, a tributary of the Passaic River in New Jersey
- Peckman Preserve, 12-acre nature preserve in Little Falls, New Jersey, United States
- Jeff Peckman, an American UFO disclosure activist as well as a political candidate for the Natural Law Party
