= Peckman Preserve =

Coordinates: 40°52′34″N 74°13′18″W

- Interactive map of Peckman Preserve
- Type: County park
- Location: Little Falls, United States
- Area: 12 acres (4.9 ha)
- Operator: Passaic County Parks & Recreation

Peckman Preserve is a 12-acre nature preserve that is located off Wilmore Road in Little Falls, New Jersey, United States. It was acquired subsequent to the completion of the 2001 Open Space Fund and Recreation Master Plan, and is adjacent to the filled bed of the Morris Canal.

Parking is provided on local streets, and the site may also be accessed by NJ Transit bus routes 28, 704, 191, 397, and 705. These sites are less than a 10-minute walk from the entrance to the park alongside East Main Street (County Road 631).
