= Cullen (surname) =

Cullen is an Irish surname. It is an Anglicised form of Gaelic Ó Cuileáin "descendant of Cuileán", a name meaning "wolfhound whelp", "young hound". It is also considered by some to mean the "handsome one". The Uí Cuileáin of County Tyrone were erenaghs of Clogher. According to historian C. Thomas Cairney, the O'Cullanes were one of the chiefly families of the Uí Fidgenti who were a tribe of the Erainn who were the second wave of Celts to settle in Ireland between about 500 and 100 BC.

Cullen is also found as a surname in Scotland and England; an example being the Cullen baronets.

== People with the surname Cullen ==
=== A ===
- Adam Cullen (1965–2012), Australian artist
- Alexander Lamb Cullen (1920–2013), British electrical engineer
- Alice Cullen (politician) (1891–1969), UK politician
- Archibald Howard Cullen (1887–1968), bishop of Grahamstown, South Africa

=== B ===
- Bill Cullen (1920–1990), American game show host
- Bill Cullen (businessman) (born 1942), Irish businessman and philanthropist
- Blake Cullen (born 2002), English cricketer
- Brett Cullen (born 1956), American actor
- Bud Cullen (1927–2005), Canadian Federal Court judge

=== C ===
- Catherine Cullen, American politician
- Charles Cullen (born 1960), nurse and serial killer
- Christian Cullen (born 1976), New Zealand rugby player
- Countee Cullen (1903–1946), African-American poet of the Harlem Renaissance

=== D ===
- Dan Cullen (born 1984), Australian cricketer
- Danny Cullen (born 1987/8), Irish hurler
- David Cullen (disambiguation), several people
- Domingo Cullen (1791–1839), Argentine politician

=== E ===
- Edgar M. Cullen (1843–1922), Chief Judge of the New York Court of Appeals, 1904–1913
- Eric Cullen (1965–1996), Scottish comedy actor

=== F ===
- Francis Cullen (born 1951), American criminologist

=== G ===
- Geoff Cullen (born 1977), Australian cricketer
- Gordon Cullen, English architect

=== H ===
- Hedley Cullen, Australian TV host (as "Deadly Earnest")
- Helen F. Cullen (1919–2007), American mathematician
- Hugh Roy Cullen (1881–1957), American oil businessman and philanthropist

=== I ===
- Ian Cullen (1939–2019), British actor

=== J ===
- Jack Cullen (born 1939), American baseball pitcher
- James Cullen (mathematician), described Cullen numbers
- James Cullen (PTAA), founder of the Pioneer Total Abstinence Association
- James P. Cullen, US brigadier general
- Jane Lunnon, maiden name Cullen (born 1969), English headmistress
- Joe Cullen (American football), American football coach
- Joe Cullen (darts player) (born 1989), English darts player
- John Cullen (disambiguation), several people
  - John Michael Cullen (1927–2001), Australian ornithologist
- Jonathan Cullen (born 1960), English actor
- Joseph Cullen (1849–1917), Australian politician

=== L ===
- Leo Cullen (rugby union) (born 1978), Irish rugby player
- Lori Cullen, Canadian singer-songwriter

=== M ===
- Maggie Cullen (born 2000), Argentine singer
- Martin Cullen (born 1954), Irish politician
- Matt Cullen (born 1976), NHL hockey player
- Maurice Cullen (boxer) (1937–2001), English boxer
- Max Cullen (born 1940), Australian actor and artist
- Michael Cullen (disambiguation), several people

- Michael Cullen (politician) (1945–2021), New Zealand politician
- Michael C. Cullen or Mike Dred (born 1967), British DJ, music producer, and sound engineer
- Michael J. Cullen (1884–1936), American inventor of the supermarket

- Mick Cullen (1931–2024), Scottish footballer
- Mike Cullen or John Michael Cullen (1927–2001), Australian ornithologist
- Mortimer A. Cullen (1891–1954), New York politician

=== N ===
- Nathan Cullen (born 1972), Canadian Member of Parliament
- Nigel Cullen (1917–1941), Australian fighter ace
- Nora Cullen (1905–1990), Argentine actress

=== P ===
- Paddy Cullen (1944–2025), Irish Gaelic footballer and manager
- Patricio Cullen (1826–1877), Argentine politician
- Patrick Cullen (artist) (born 1949), British artist
- Paul Cullen (bishop) (1803–1878), 19th-century Irish cardinal
- Paul Cullen (rugby league) (born 1963), British rugby coach
- Peter Cullen (1941–2026), Canadian voice actor
- Philippa Cullen (1950–1975), Australian performance artist

=== R ===
- Robert Cullen (footballer), Irish-Japanese football player
- Rowena Cullen (born 1946), New Zealand information services academic

=== S ===
- Sarah Cullen (1949–2012), British television journalist
- Seán Cullen (born 1965), Canadian comedian

=== T ===
- Thomas H. Cullen (1868–1944), United States Representative
- Tim Cullen (born 1942), American baseball player
- Tim Cullen (banker) (born 1944), British World Bank negotiator
- Timothy Cullen (1944–2024), American state senator
- Tina Cullen (born 1970), English hockey player

=== W ===
- William Cullen (disambiguation), several people
  - William Cullen (1710–1790), Scottish physician and chemist
  - William Cullen, Baron Cullen of Whitekirk (born 1935), Lord President of Scotland's Court of Session
- Wyatt Cullen (born 2008), American ice hockey player

== Fictional characters ==
- Edward Cullen, in the Twilight series by Stephenie Meyer
- Linden Cullen, from the Holby City series
- Matthew and Emma Cullen, in the 2016 film The Magnificent Seven
- Cullen Rutherford, in the fantasy role-playing video game Dragon Age
- Cullen Bohannon, in the western drama Hell on Wheels

== See also ==
- Cullen (disambiguation)
- Collin (surname)
- Collins (surname)
- Mullen
- Irish clans
