= Michael Cullen =

Michael or Mick Cullen may refer to:

- Michael Cullen (politician) (1945–2021), New Zealand politician
- Michael C. Cullen or Mike Dred (born 1967), British DJ, music producer, and sound engineer
- Michael J. Cullen (1884–1936), American inventor of the supermarket
- Mick Cullen (1931–2024), Scottish footballer
- Mike Cullen (scientist) (1927–2001), Australian ornithologist

== See also ==
- Cullen (surname)
