= John Cullen (disambiguation) =

John Cullen (born 1964) is a Canadian ice hockey player.

John Cullen may also refer to:

- John Cullen (baseball) (1854–1921), Major League Baseball player
- John Cullen (chemical engineer) (1926–2018), head of the UK Health and Safety Commission
- John Cullen (field hockey) (born 1937), New Zealand competitor in field hockey at the 1964 Summer Olympics
- John Cullen (police officer) (1850–1939), New Zealand police officer and commissioner
- John Cullen (rugby union) (born 1990), American rugby union player
- John Hugh Cullen (1883–1970), Irish-born Catholic priest, writer and historian in Australia
- John J. Cullen (1845–1896), New York politician
- John Michael Cullen (1927–2001), ornithologist
- Sir John Cullen, 2nd Baronet (1652–1677), of the Cullen baronets
- John C. Cullen, US Coast Guardsman, Legion of Merit recipient for actions during Operation Pastorius

== See also ==
- Jon Cullen (born 1973), footballer
- Jack Cullen (born 1939), baseball player
- Cullen (surname)
