= Lord Cullen =

Lord Cullen may refer to:

- Francis Grant, Lord Cullen (died 1726/1663–1726), Scottish judge, Solicitor General for Scotland and Lord of Session
- Robert Cullen, Lord Cullen (1742–1810), Scottish judge, Lord of Session from 1796, involved in founding the Royal Society of Edinburgh
- William James Cullen, Lord Cullen (1859–1941), Scottish judge, Senator of the College of Justice from 1909
- Brien Cokayne, 1st Baron Cullen of Ashbourne (1864–1932), British businessman and banker
- William Cullen, Baron Cullen of Whitekirk (born 1935), Scottish judge; Lord Justice General and Lord President of the Court of Session, additional Lord of Appeal in the House of Lords

== See also ==
- William Cullen (disambiguation)
