= Supermarket =

Large format of grocery store

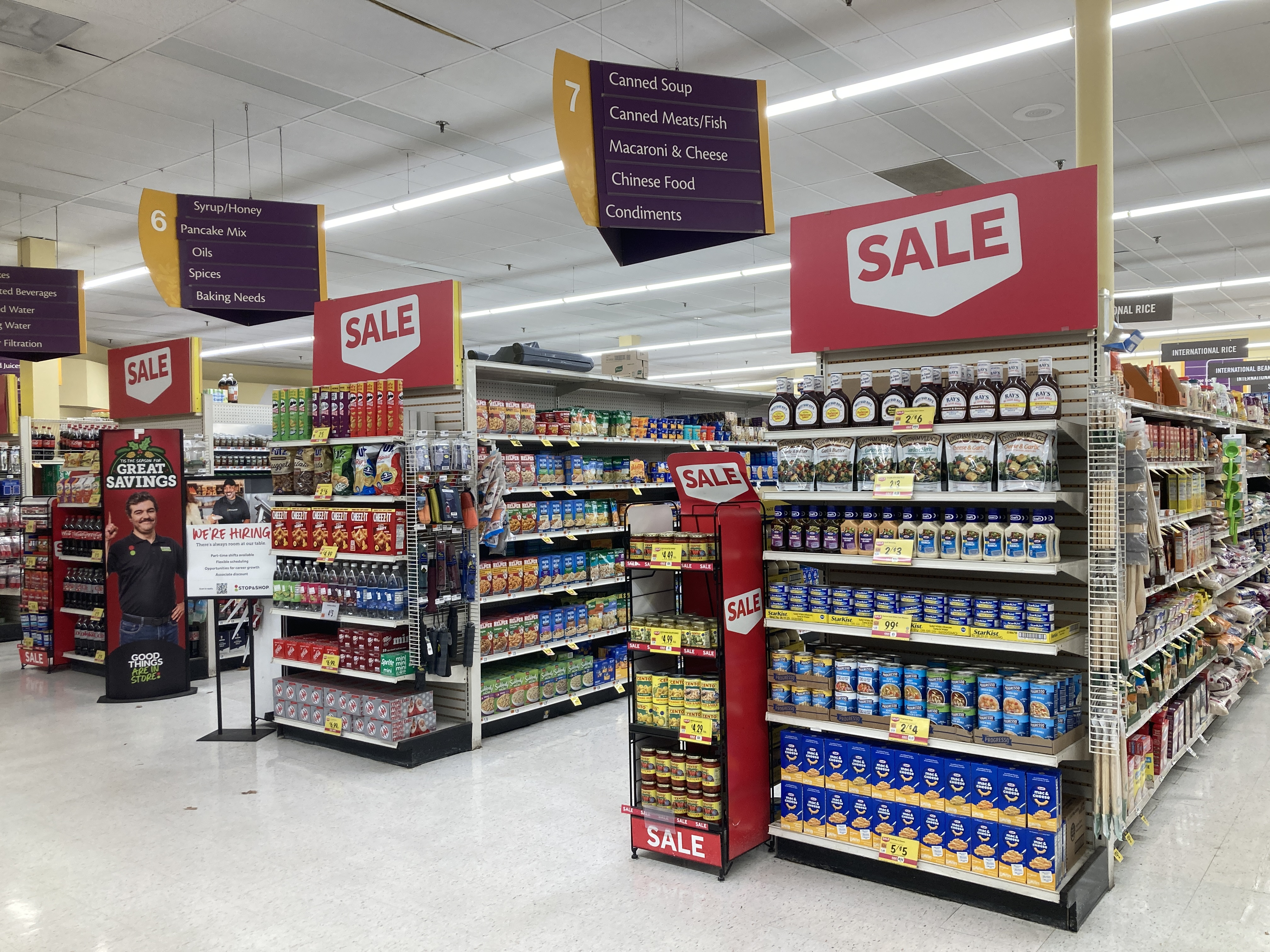
A typical Stop & Shop supermarket in Long Branch, New Jersey

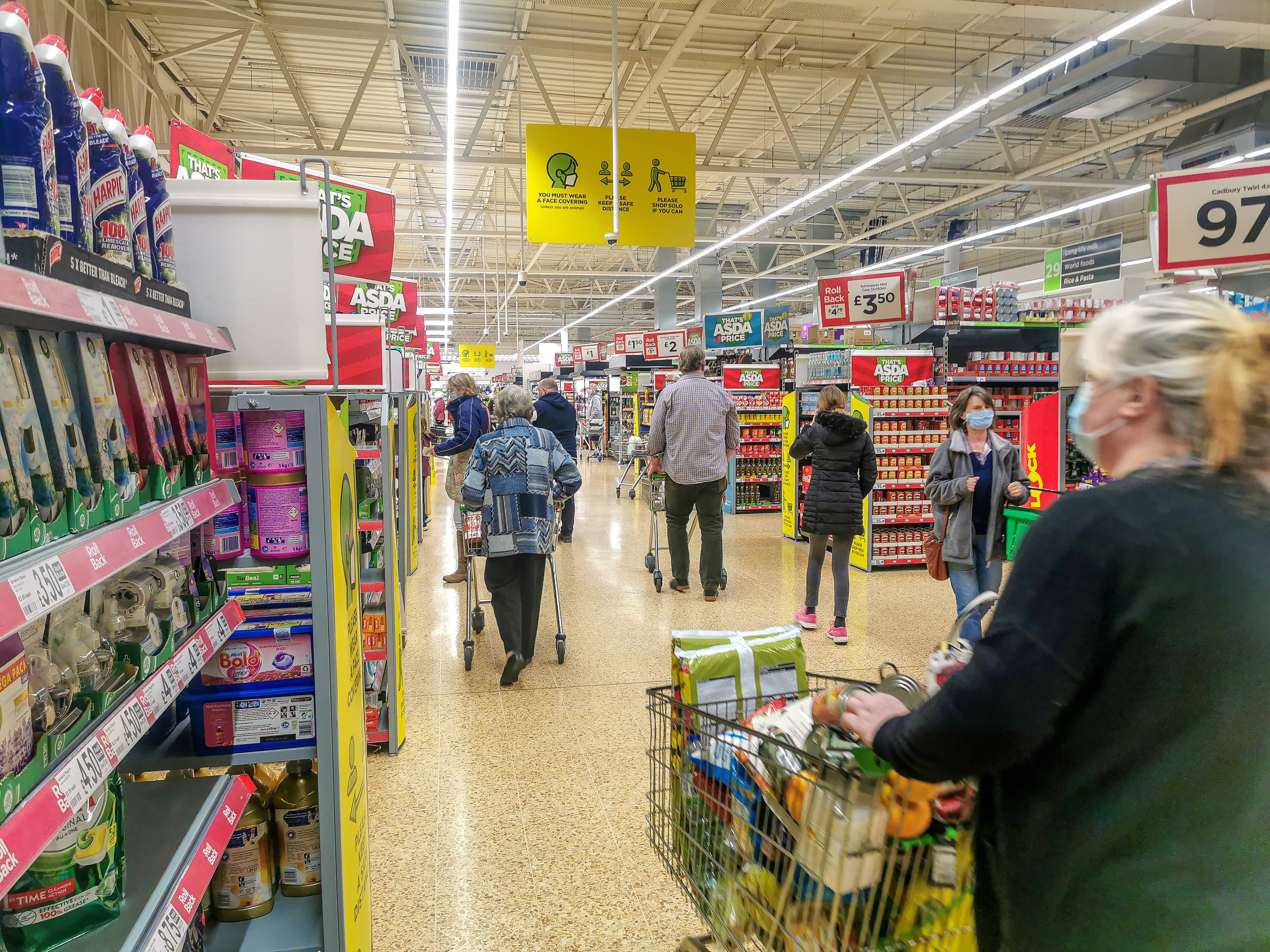
Inside an Asda supermarket in the United Kingdom

A supermarket is a self-service shop offering a wide variety of food, beverages and household products, organized into sections under one roof. The supermarket retail format first appeared around 1930 in the United States as the culmination of almost two decades of retail innovations to the grocery store, and began to spread to other countries after extensive worldwide publicity in 1956. In everyday American English usage, "grocery store" is often used interchangeably with "supermarket", while in other regions a supermarket is larger and has a wider selection, but is smaller and more limited in the range of merchandise than a hypermarket or megastore, which developed decades later.

The supermarket typically has places for fresh meat, fresh produce, dairy, deli items, baked goods, and similar foodstuffs. Shelf space is also reserved for canned and packaged goods and for various non-food items such as kitchenware, household cleaners, pharmacy products and pet supplies. Some supermarkets also sell other household products that are consumed regularly, such as alcohol (where permitted), medicine, and clothing, and some sell a much wider range of non-food products: DVDs, art supplies, sporting equipment, board games, and seasonal items (e.g., Christmas wrapping paper, Easter eggs, school uniforms, Valentine's Day themed gifts, Mother's Day gifts, Father's Day gifts and Halloween).

A larger full-service supermarket combined with a department store is sometimes known as a hypermarket. Other services may include those of banks, cafés, childcare centers/creches, insurance (and other financial services), mobile phone sales, photo processing, video rentals, pharmacies, and filling stations. In the US, if the eatery in a supermarket is substantial enough, the facility may be called a "grocerant", a portmanteau of "grocery" and "restaurant".

The traditional supermarket occupies a large amount of floor space, usually on a single level. It is usually situated near a residential area in order to be convenient to consumers. The basic appeal is the availability of a broad selection of goods under a single roof, at relatively low prices. Other advantages include ease of parking and frequently the convenience of shopping hours that extend into the evening or even 24 hours of the day. Supermarkets usually allocate large budgets to advertising, typically through newspapers and television. They also present elaborate in-shop displays of products.

Supermarkets typically are chain stores, supplied by the distribution centers of their parent companies, thus increasing opportunities for economies of scale. Supermarkets usually offer products at relatively low prices by using their buying power to buy goods from manufacturers at lower prices than smaller stores can. They also minimize financing costs by paying for goods at least 30 days after receipt and some extract credit terms of 90 days or more from vendors. Certain products (typically staple foods such as bread, milk and sugar) are very occasionally sold as loss leaders so as to attract shoppers to their store. Supermarkets make up for their low margins by a high volume of sales, and with sales of higher-margin items bought by the customers. Self-service with shopping carts (trolleys) or baskets reduces labor costs, and many supermarket chains are attempting further reduction by shifting to self-service check-outs.

== History ==
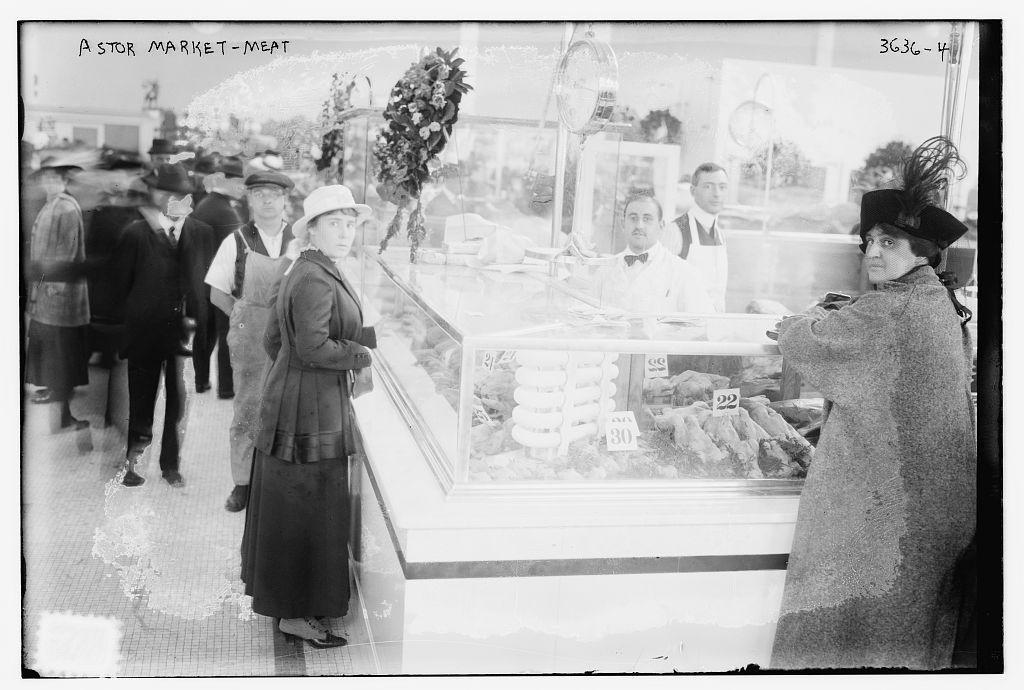
Astor Market in New York, one predecessor of the modern supermarket, operated from 1915 to 1917.

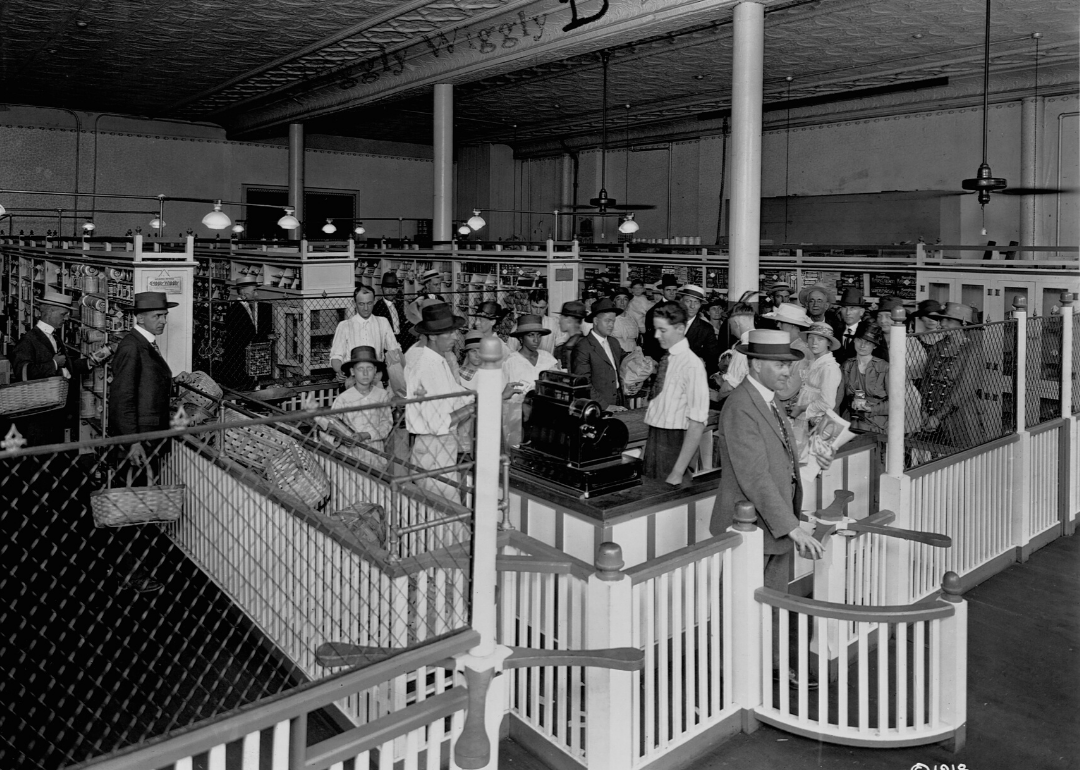
Piggly Wiggly store in Memphis, Tennessee, the first supermarket, 1918

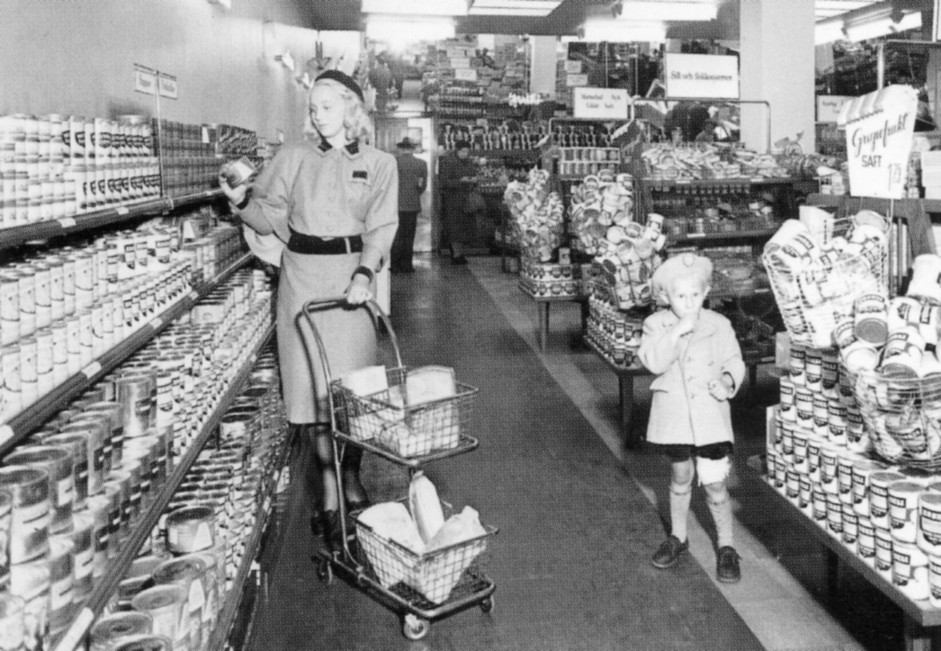
A supermarket in Sweden, 1941

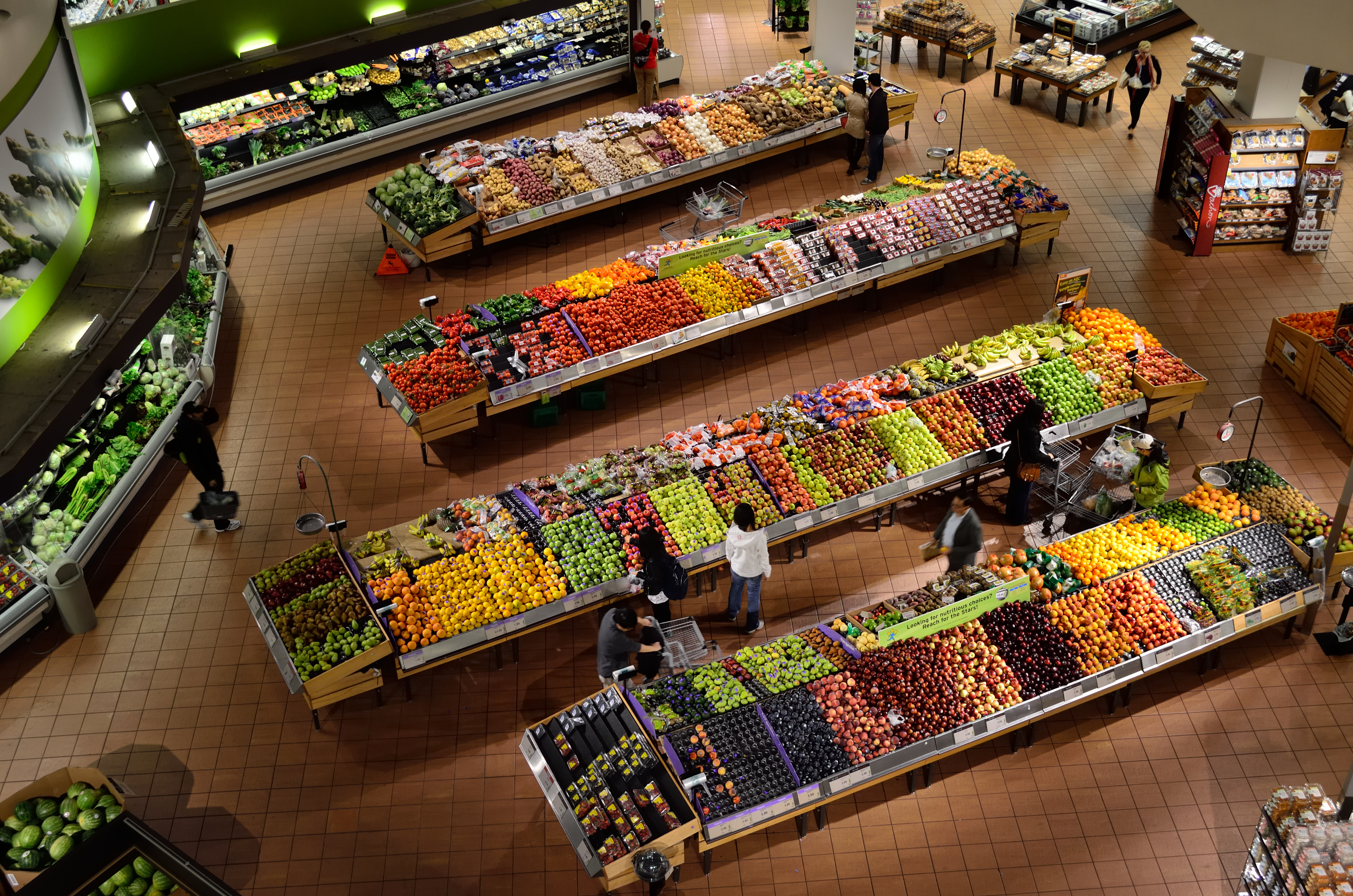
A Loblaws produce and fruit section at Empress Walk, Toronto, 2012

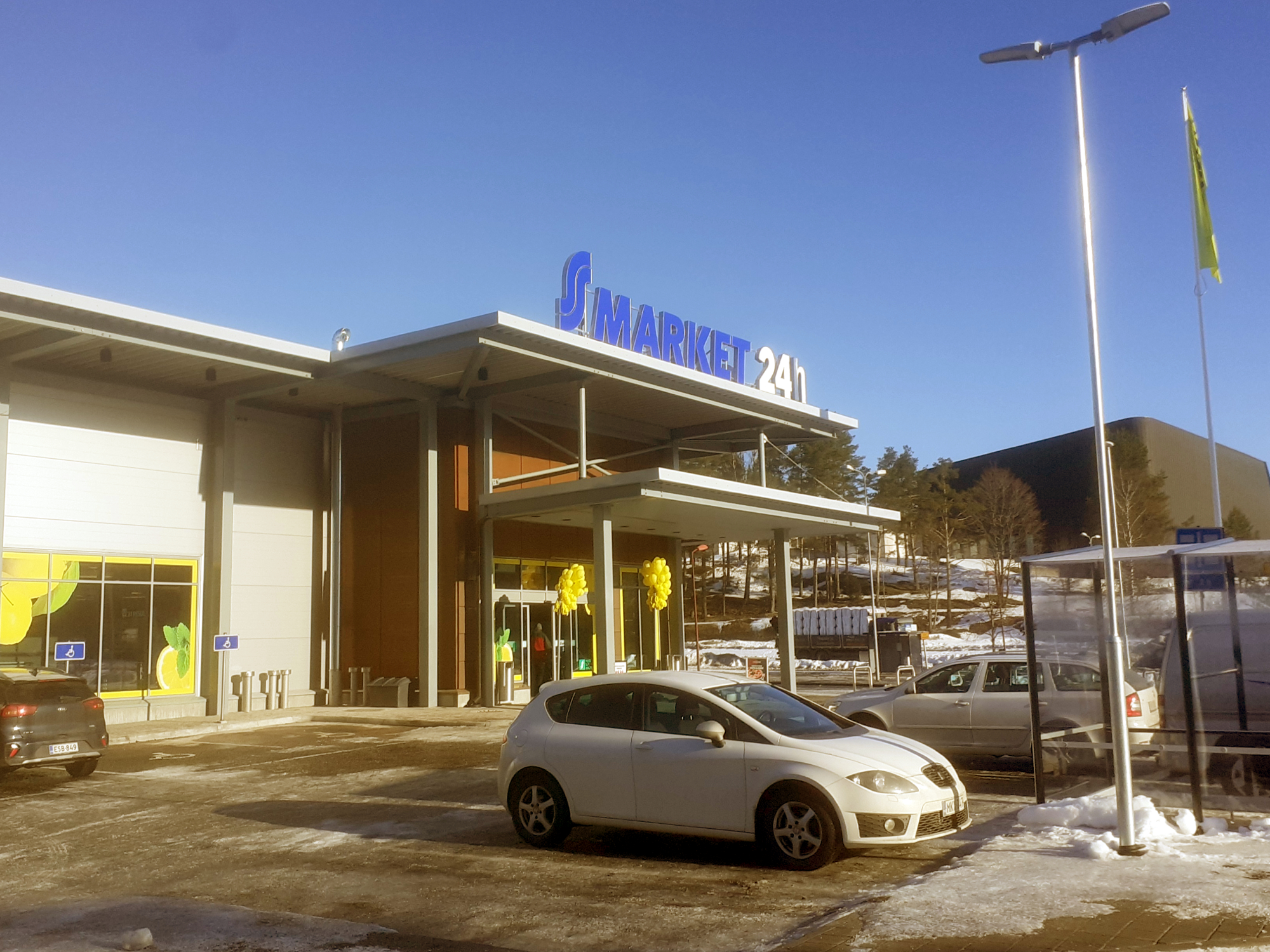
S-market store with 24/7 service in Klaukkala, Finland, 2022

=== Early history of retail food sales ===
Historically, the earliest retailers were peddlers who marketed their wares in the streets, but by the 1920s, retail food sales in the United States had mostly shifted to small corner grocery stores. In that era, the standard retail grocery business model was for a clerk to fetch products from shelves behind the merchant's counter while customers waited in front of the counter, indicating the items they wanted. Customers needed to ask because "most stores were designed to keep customers (and their children) away from the food". Most foods and merchandise did not come in individually wrapped consumer-sized packages, so the clerk had to measure out and wrap the precise amount desired. Merchants did not post prices, which forced customers to haggle and bargain with clerks to reach fair prices for their purchases. Haggling was further complicated by other factors such as the clerk's awareness of the customer's social status and ability to pay. This business model had already been established in Europe for millennia, with examples of primitive retail stores found as far back as ancient Rome. It offered extensive opportunities for social interaction: many regarded this style of shopping as "a social occasion" and would often "pause for conversations with the staff or other customers".

These practices were by nature slow, had high labor intensity, and were quite expensive. The number of customers who could be attended to at one time was limited by the number of staff employed in the store. Early grocery stores were "austere" and tiny by modern standards, with as few as 450 items. Shopping for groceries often involved trips to multiple specialty shops, such as a greengrocer, butcher, bakery, fishmonger and dry goods store, in addition to a general store. Milk and other items of short shelf life were delivered by a milkman. These small retailers were the final links in a "long and tortuous food chain," as most of them were far too small to deal directly with most of the persons who actually harvested, processed, and distributed all that food. During the 1920s, the highly inefficient nature of the American food distribution system meant that the "average urban family spent fully one-third of its budget on food".

One of the most important defining features of the modern supermarket is cheap food. The vast abundance of cheap, wholesome food which modern consumers take for granted today was simply unimaginable before the middle of the 20th century, to the point that the first American supermarket customers in the 1930s were overcome with emotion at the sight of so much cheap food.

Before the 20th century, food was neither cheap, nor wholesome, nor abundant. For example, in 1812, almost 90 percent of Americans worked in food production, and they struggled to stay alive on food which was often scarce, of poor quality, and riddled with diseases which could and did often kill them.

=== Early experiments in building large stores and chain stores ===
The concept of an inexpensive food market relying on economies of scale was developed by Vincent Astor, but he was ahead of his time. He founded the Astor Market in 1915, investing $750,000 of his fortune into a 165′ by 125′ (50×38-metre) corner of 95th and Broadway, Manhattan, creating, in effect, an open-air mini-mall that sold meat, fruit, produce and flowers. The expectation was that customers would come from great distances ("miles around"), but in the end, even attracting people from ten blocks away was difficult, and the market folded in 1917.

The Great Atlantic & Pacific Tea Company (A&P), which was established in 1859, was an early grocery store chain in Canada and the United States. It became common in North American cities in the 1920s. Early chains such as A&P did not sell fresh meats or produce. During the 1920s, to reduce the hassle of visiting multiple stores, U.S. grocery store chains such as A&P introduced the combination store. This was a grocery store which combined several departments under one roof, but generally maintained the traditional system of clerks pulling products from shelves on request. By 1929, only one in three U.S. grocery stores was a combination store.

=== Self-service grocery stores ===
The concept of a self-service grocery store predates the supermarket; it was developed by entrepreneur Clarence Saunders at his Piggly Wiggly stores, the first of which opened in 1916. Saunders was awarded several patents for the ideas he incorporated into his stores. The stores were a financial success and Saunders began to offer franchises.

The general trend since then has been to stock shelves at night so that customers, the following day, can obtain their own goods and bring them to the front of the store to pay for them. Although there is a higher risk of shoplifting, the costs of appropriate security measures ideally will be outweighed by reduced labor costs.

=== Birth of the supermarket ===
Historically, there has been much debate about the origin of the supermarket. For example, Southern California grocery store chains Alpha Beta and Ralphs both have strong claims to being the first supermarket. By 1930, both chains were already operating multiple 12,000-square-foot (1,100 m^{2}) self-service grocery stores. However, as of 1930, both chains were not yet true supermarkets in the modern sense because their prices remained quite high; as noted above, one of the most important defining features of the supermarket is cheap food. Their main selling point was free parking. Other strong contenders in Texas included Weingarten's and Henke & Pillot.

To end the debate, the Food Marketing Institute in conjunction with the Smithsonian Institution and with funding from H.J. Heinz, researched the issue. They defined the attributes of a supermarket as "self-service, separate product departments, discount pricing, marketing and volume selling". They determined that the first true supermarket in the United States was opened by a former Kroger employee, Michael J. Cullen, on 4 August 1930, inside a 6,000-square-foot (560 m^{2}) former garage in Jamaica, Queens in New York City. The store King Kullen, operated under the logic of "pile it high and sell it cheap". The store layout was designed by Joseph Unger, who originated the concept of customers using baskets to collect groceries before checking out at a counter. Everything displayed for sale in the store "had prices clearly marked", meaning that consumers would no longer need to haggle over prices. Cullen described his store as "the world's greatest price wrecker". At the time of his death in 1936, there were seventeen King Kullen stores in operation. Although Saunders had brought the world self-service, uniform stores, and nationwide marketing, Cullen built on this idea by adding separate food departments, selling large volumes of food at discount prices and adding a parking lot. Moreover, the supermarket format as pioneered by King Kullen was not only cheap, but convenient, in how it combined so many different departments under one roof which had formerly required trips to separate stores.

Early supermarkets like King Kullen were called "cheapy markets" by industry experts at the time because they were literally so cheap, thanks to their rock-bottom prices; this was soon replaced by the less derogatory and more positive phrase "super market". The compound phrase was then closed up to become the modern term "supermarket".

=== Grocery stores become supermarkets ===
A Safeway advertisement from the 1950s

Other established American grocery chains in the 1930s, such as Kroger, Wegmans and Safeway Inc. at first resisted Cullen's ideas, but were eventually forced to build their own supermarkets as the economy sank into the Great Depression. American consumers became extraordinarily price-sensitive at a level never experienced before. Kroger took the new retail format one step further and pioneered the first supermarket surrounded on all four sides by a parking lot.

For A&P, the largest grocery store chain of that era, the conversion from traditional grocery stores to supermarkets disrupted the lives and careers of thousands of retail employees. The armies of retail clerks who were the public face of the traditionally slow and social retail experience were replaced with repetitive, specialized jobs necessary to operate a modern supermarket. Stock clerks, usually male, moved boxes and kept the shelves full of goods, while checkout clerks (cashiers), usually female, assisted shoppers. One of King Kullen's earliest imitators, Big Bear, opened its first supermarket in 1933 in New Jersey and collected more revenue in one year than over a hundred A&P stores. By 1937, 44 percent of A&P stores were losing money. By 1938, A&P had already opened over 1,100 supermarkets. By February 1940, A&P had closed 5,950 grocery stores and cut its percentage of money-losing stores to 18 percent. In A&P's traditional grocery stores, "wages and overhead expenses" had consumed 18 percent of sales, while in A&P's newly opened supermarkets in those same neighborhoods, those same numbers were less than 12 percent of sales.

Once the large chains joined the supermarket trend, the new retail format exploded across the country like a wildfire. The number of American supermarkets almost tripled from 1,200 in 32 states in 1936 to over 3,000 in 47 states in 1937. It was well over 15,000 by 1950. One sign of the supermarket format's success in slashing labor costs, overhead, and food prices was that the percentage of disposable income spent by American consumers on food plunged "from 21 percent in 1930 to 16 percent in 1940". The modern era of "cheap food" had begun.

As large chain stores began to dominate the American grocery landscape with their low overhead and low prices (while crushing numerous independent small stores along the way), a backlash to this radical alteration of food distribution infrastructure appeared in the form of numerous anti-chain campaigns. The idea of "monopsony", proposed by Cambridge economist Joan Robinson in 1933, that a single buyer could outmaneuver a market of multiple sellers, became a strong anti-chain rhetorical device. With public backlash came political pressure to even the playing field for smaller vendors lacking the luxury of economies of scale. In 1936, the Robinson-Patman Act was implemented as a way of preventing such large chains from using their buying power to reap advantages over small stores, although the act was not well enforced and did not have much impact on such chains.

Supermarkets rapidly proliferated across both Canada and the United States with the growth of automobile ownership and suburban development after World War II. Most North American supermarkets are located in suburban strip shopping centers as an anchor store along with other smaller retailers. They are generally regional rather than national in their company branding. Kroger is the most nationally oriented supermarket chain in the United States, but it has preserved most of its regional brands, including Ralphs, City Market, King Soopers, Fry's, Smith's, and QFC.

=== International expansion ===
By the 1950s, supermarkets had become part of the everyday lives of American consumers, but were still extremely rare outside of the United States. Most persons outside the United States had never seen a supermarket or even heard of the term. That began to change after 1956, when the U.S. Department of Agriculture presented an "American Way exhibit" at the International Food Congress in Rome, Italy. The exhibit included "the first fully stocked supermarket outside of the United States". The exhibit was a rather "modest staging" with only about 2,500 items, not a truly comprehensive duplicate of a typical full-size U.S. supermarket, and yet it was much larger than anything the world had ever seen. Just like the American consumers who had entered the first supermarkets two decades earlier, conference attendees, local Italian visitors, and the international news media were all astonished, bewildered, and stunned by the "mountains of food".

In 1957, the U.S. Department of Commerce and the National Association of Food Chains orchestrated an even grander presentation, Supermarket USA, at the Zagreb International Trade Fair in what was then part of Yugoslavia. Supermarket USA featured 4,000 consumer items in a 10,000 square-foot (929 m²) exhibit, "the first fully operational American-style supermarket in a communist country". The American Way supermercato the year before and Supermarket USA were among the first of several instances in which American supermarkets were deployed internationally at the height of the Cold War as shock and awe instruments of American propaganda to demonstrate the supposed superiority of Western Bloc capitalism over Eastern Bloc communism.

Before then, a few countries had already begun to implement supermarkets due to their proximity to or affinity for the United States. Canada, to the north, had implemented the new retail format at the same time during the 1930s. For example, Québec's first supermarket opened in 1934 in Montréal, under the banner Steinberg's. In Canada, the largest supermarket chain is Loblaw, which operates stores under a variety of banners targeted to different segments and regions, including Fortinos, Zehrs, No Frills, the Real Canadian Superstore, and Loblaws, the foundation of the company. Sobeys is Canada's second largest supermarket with locations across the country, operating under many banners (Sobeys IGA in Quebec).

In the United Kingdom, self-service shopping took longer to become established, despite its Special Relationship with the United States. In 1947, there were just ten self-service shops in the country. In 1951, ex-US Navy sailor Patrick Galvani, son-in-law of Express Dairies chairman, made a pitch to the board to open a chain of supermarkets across the country. The UK's first supermarket under the new Premier Supermarkets brand opened in Streatham, South London, taking in ten times as much revenue per week as the average British general store of the time. Other chains caught on quickly. The number of British supermarkets exploded from roughly 50 in 1950 to 572 by 1961, and finally to over 3,400 by 1969. After Galvani lost out to Tesco's Jack Cohen in 1960 to buy 212 stores of the Irwin's chain, the sector underwent significant consolidation, resulting in "the big four" dominant UK supermarket chains: Tesco, Asda, Sainsbury's and Morrisons.

In the 1950s, supermarkets frequently issued trading stamps as incentives to customers. Today, most chains issue store-specific "membership cards", "club cards", or "loyalty cards". These typically enable the cardholder to receive special members-only discounts on certain items when the credit card-like device is scanned at the checkout. Sales of selected data generated by club cards is becoming a significant revenue stream for some supermarkets.

=== In the 21st century ===
A report published by the international organization ActionAid in 2007, Who pays? estimated that 32 million people shopped in British supermarkets every week.

As of 2018, there were approximately 38,000 supermarkets in the supermarket's birthplace, the United States; Americans spent $701 billion at supermarkets that year; and the American supermarket stood at the pinnacle of a food production and distribution system so efficient that less than three percent of the U.S. population produced more than enough food to feed everyone. The average American adult "will spend 2 percent of their life inside" supermarkets.

In the 21st century, traditional supermarkets in many countries face intense competition from discounters such as Wal-Mart, Aldi and Lidl, which typically is non-union and operates with better buying power. Other competition exists from warehouse clubs such as Costco that offer savings to customers buying in bulk quantities. Superstores, such as those operated by Wal-Mart and Asda, often offer a wide range of goods and services in addition to foods. In Australia, Aldi, Woolworths and Coles are the major players running the industry with fierce competition among all the three. The rising market share of Aldi has forced the other two to cut prices and increase their private label product ranges. The proliferation of such warehouse and superstores has contributed to the continuing disappearance of smaller, local grocery stores, the increased dependence on the automobile, and suburban sprawl because of the necessity for large floor space and increased vehicular traffic. For example, in 2009 51% of Wal-Mart's $251 billion domestic sales were recorded from grocery goods. Some critics consider the chains' common practice of selling loss leaders to be anti-competitive. They are also wary of the negotiating power that large, often multinationals have with suppliers around the world.

=== Online-only supermarkets (21st century) ===
During the dot-com boom, Webvan, an online-only supermarket, was formed and went bankrupt after three years and was acquired by Amazon. The British online supermarket Ocado, which uses a high degree of automation in its warehouses, was the first successful online-only supermarket. Ocado expanded into providing services to other supermarket firms such as Waitrose and Morrisons. Grocery stores such as Walmart employ food delivery services offered by third parties such as DoorDash. Other online food delivery services, such as Deliveroo in the United Kingdom, have begun to pay specific attention to supermarket delivery.

Micro-fulfillment centers (MFC) are relatively small warehouses with sophisticated automated rack-and-tote systems which prepare orders for pickup and delivery. Once the order is complete, the customer will pick it up (i.e. "click-and-collect") or have it fulfilled via home delivery. Supermarkets are investing in micro-fulfillment centers with the hope that automation can help reduce the costs of online commerce and e-commerce by shortening the distances from store to home and speeding up deliveries. MFCs are said by many to be the key to profitably fulfilling online orders.

== Types ==
=== U.S. categorization ===
The U.S. FMI food industry association, drawing on research by Willard Bishop, defines the following formats (store types) that sell groceries:

Store type	Definition as per the U.S. FMI Food Industry Association/Bishop
Traditional Grocery
Traditional supermarket	Stores offering a full line of groceries, meat, and produce with at least US$2 million in annual sales and up to 15% of their sales in general merchandise (GM) and health & beauty care (HBC). These stores typically carry anywhere from 15,000 to 60,000 SKUs (depending on the size of the store), and may offer a service deli, a service bakery, and/or a pharmacy e.g., Albertsons, Safeway, Kroger and Prime Supermarket.
Fresh format	Different from traditional supermarkets and traditional natural food stores, fresh stores emphasize perishables and offer center-store assortments that differ from those of traditional retailers—especially in the areas of ethnic, natural, and organic, e.g., Whole Foods, The Fresh Market, and some independents.
Limited-assortment discount format	A low-priced value-for-money grocery store that offers a limited assortment of center-store and perishable items (fewer than 2,000 SKUs), e.g., Aldi, Lidl, Trader Joe's, and Save-A-Lot.
Super warehouse	A high-volume hybrid of a large traditional supermarket and a warehouse store. Super warehouse stores typically offer a full range of service departments, quality perishables, and reduced prices, e.g., Cub Foods, Food 4 Less, and Smart & Final.
Other (Small Convenience Grocery)	The small corner grocery store that carries a limited selection of staples and other convenience goods. These to-go stores generate approximately $1 million in business annually, e.g. 7-Eleven, FamilyMart, Alfamart
Non-Traditional Grocery
Wholesale club	A membership retail/wholesale hybrid with a varied selection and limited variety of products presented in a warehouse-type environment. These approximately 120,000 square-foot stores have 60% to 70% GM/HBC and a grocery line dedicated to large sizes and bulk sales. Memberships include both business accounts and consumer groups, e.g., Sam's Club, Costco, and BJ's.
Supercenter	A hybrid of a large traditional supermarket and a mass merchandiser. Supercenters offer a wide variety of food, as well as non-food merchandise. These stores average more than 170,000 square feet and typically devote as much as 40% of the space to grocery items, e.g., Walmart Supercenter, SuperTarget, Meijer, and Kroger Marketplace.
Variety store	A small store format that traditionally sold staples and knickknacks, but now sales of food and consumable items at aggressive price points that account for at least 20%, and up to 66%, of their volume, e.g., Dollar General, Dollar Tree, Action, Pep&Co, Poundland and Family Dollar.
Drug store	A prescription-based drug store that generates 20% or more of its total sales from consumables, general merchandise, and seasonal items. This channel includes major chain drug stores such as Walgreens, DM, AS Watson, and CVS.
Mass merchandiser	A large store selling primarily hardlines, clothing, electronics, and sporting goods but also carries grocery and non-edible grocery items. This channel includes traditional Walmart, Kmart, and Target.
Military (commissaries)	A format that looks like a conventional grocery store carrying groceries and consumables but is restricted to use by active or retired military personnel. Civilians usually are not allowed to shop at these stores (referred to as commissaries).
E-Commerce (food and consumables)	Food and consumable products ordered using the internet via any devices, regardless of the method of payment or fulfillment. This channel includes Amazon and Peapod as well as the E-Commerce business generated by traditional brick & mortar retailers, e.g., Coborns (Coborns Delivers) and ShopRite (ShopRite from Home and ShopRite Delivers). The other non-traditional retail segments above include their E-Commerce business.

=== Organic and environmentally-friendly supermarkets ===
Some supermarkets are focusing on selling more (or even exclusively) organically certified produce. Others are trying to differentiate themselves by selling fewer (or no) products containing palm oil. This as the demand of palm oil is a main driver for the destruction of rainforests. As a response to the growing concern on the heavy use of petroleum-based plastics for food packaging, so-called "zero waste" and "plastic-free" supermarkets and groceries are on the rise.

== Growth in developing countries ==
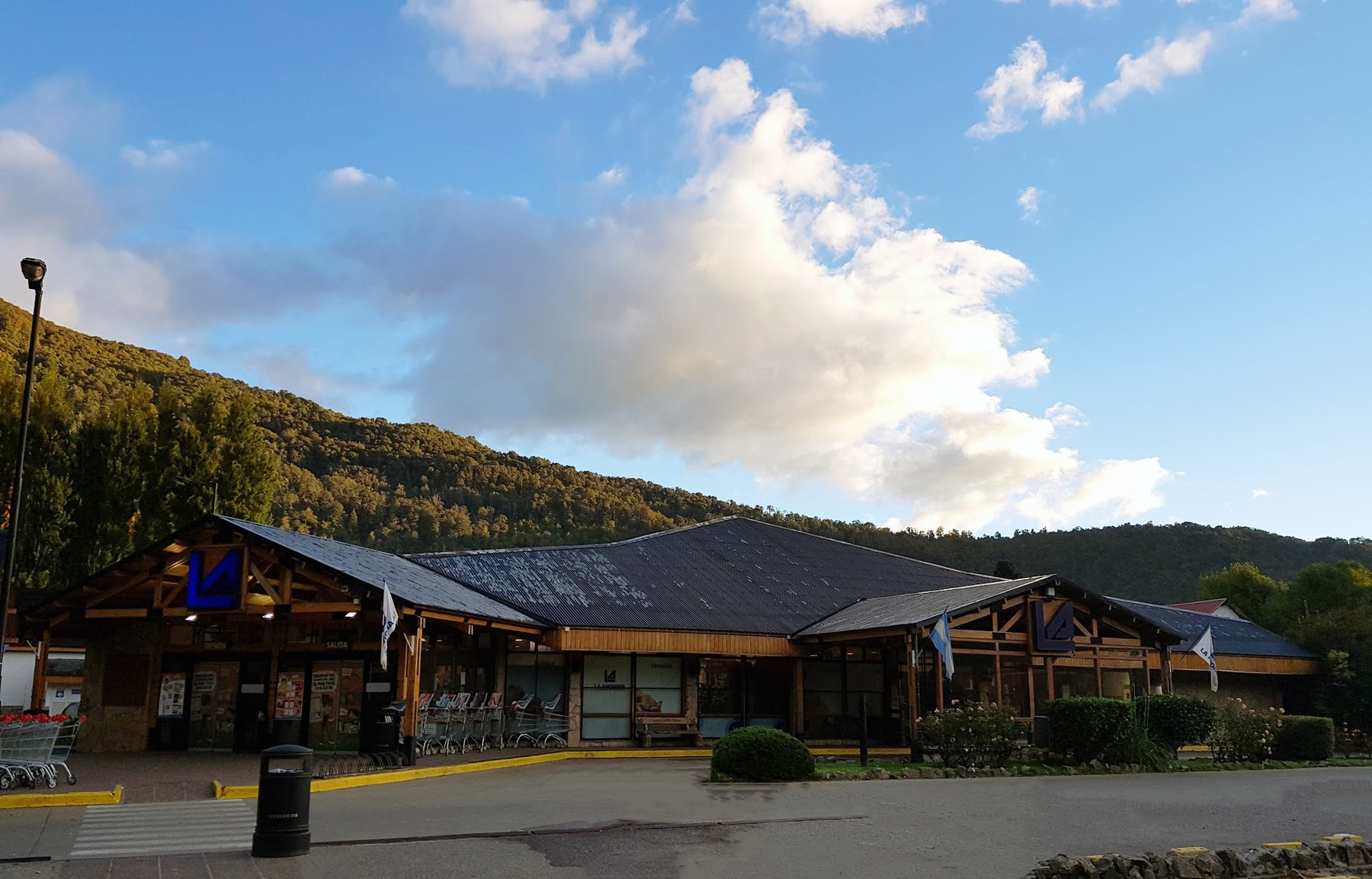
Outside of a La Anonima supermarket in Argentina

Beginning in the 1990s, the food sector in developing countries has rapidly transformed, particularly in Latin America, South-East Asia, India, China and South Africa. With growth has come considerable competition and some amount of consolidation. The growth has been driven by: increasing affluence and the rise of a middle class; the entry of women into the workforce; a consequent incentive to seek out easy-to-prepare foods; the growth in the use of refrigerators, making it possible to shop weekly instead of daily; and the growth in car ownership, facilitating journeys to distant stores and purchases of large quantities of goods. The opportunities presented by this potential have encouraged several European companies to invest in these markets (mainly in Asia) and American companies to invest in Latin America and China. Local companies also entered the market. Initial development of supermarkets has now been followed by hypermarket growth. In addition there were investments by companies such as Makro and Metro Cash and Carry in large-scale Cash-and-Carry operations.

While the growth in sales of processed foods in these countries has been much more rapid than the growth in fresh food sales, the imperative nature of supermarkets to achieve economies of scale in purchasing means that the expansion of supermarkets in these countries has important repercussions for small farmers, particularly those growing perishable crops. New supply chains have developed involving cluster formation; development of specialized wholesalers; leading farmers organizing supply, and farmer associations or cooperatives. In some cases supermarkets have organized their own procurement from small farmers; in others wholesale markets have adapted to meet supermarket needs.

== Typical supermarket merchandise ==
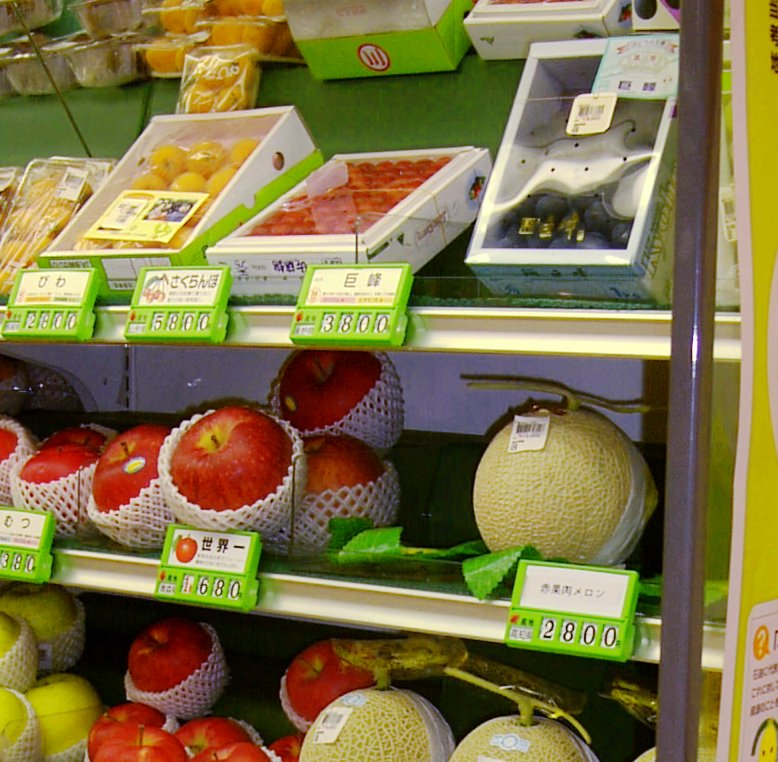
Fruit on display in a supermarket in Japan

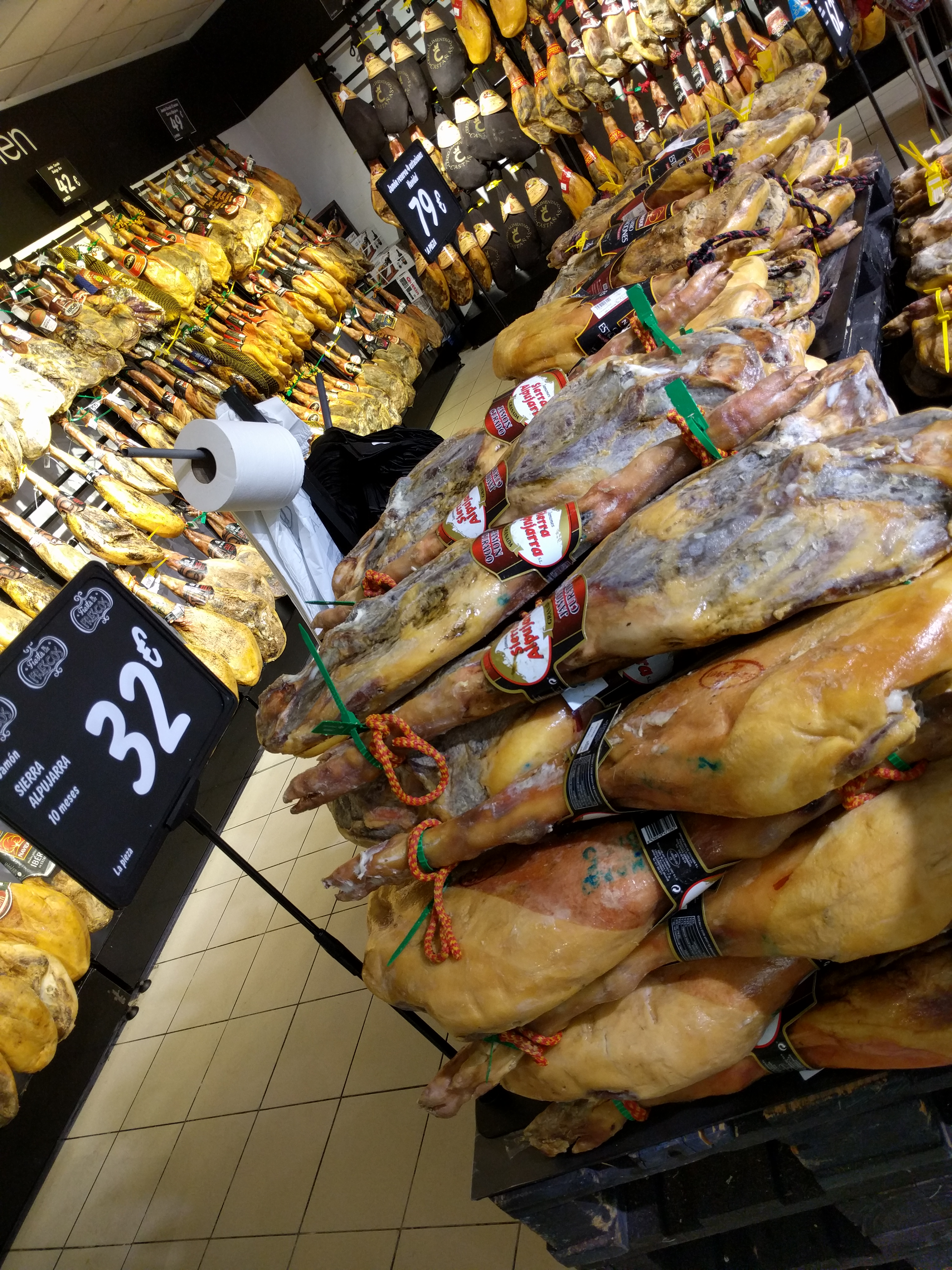
A pile of jamón in a Spanish supermarket, priced at 32 euros each

Larger supermarkets in North America and in Europe typically sell many items among many brands, sizes and varieties. U.S. publisher Supermarket News lists the following categories, for example: Hypermarkets have a larger range of non-food categories such as clothing, electronics, household decoration and appliances.

- Bakery (packaged and sometimes a service bakery and/or onsite bakery)
- Beverages (non-alcoholic packaged, sometimes also alcoholic if laws permit)
- Nonfood & Pharmacy (e.g. cigarettes, lottery tickets and over-the-counter medications (as laws permit), DVD rentals, books and magazines, including supermarket tabloids, greeting cards, toys, small selection of home goods like light bulbs, housewares (typically limited)
- Personal care e.g. cosmetics, soap, shampoo
- Produce (fresh fruits and vegetables)
- Floral (flowers and plants)
- Deli (sliced meats, cheeses, etc.)
- Prepared Foods (packaged and frozen foods)
- Meat (fresh packaged, frozen, sometimes with a butcher service counter)
- Seafood (fresh packaged, frozen, sometimes with a butcher service counter)
- Dairy (milk products and eggs)
- Center store (e.g. detergent, paper products, household cleaning supplies)
- Multicultural (ethnic foods)
- Bulk dried foods
- Animal foods, toys and products

== Layout strategies ==
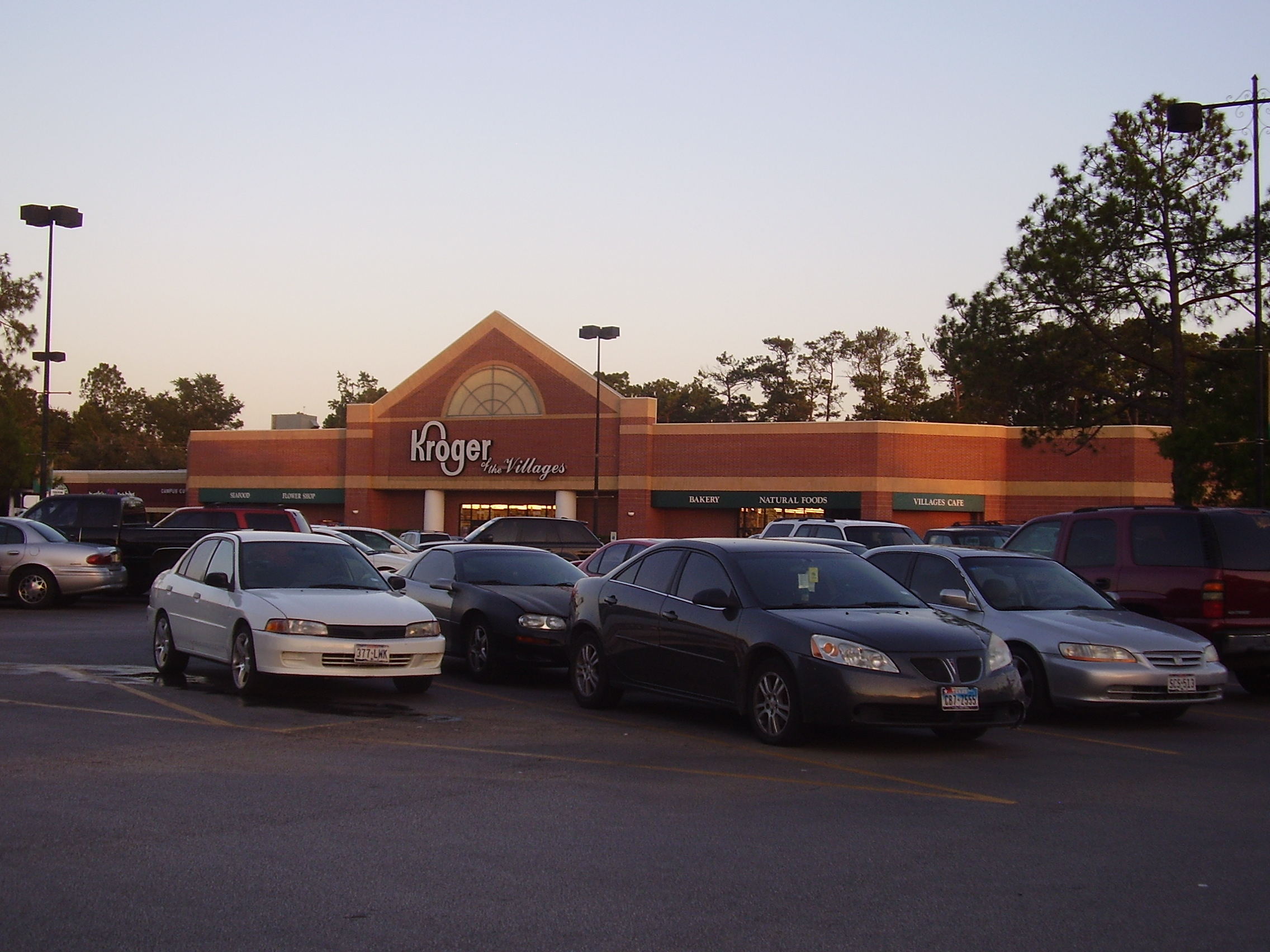
A Kroger store, Kroger of the Villages, in Hedwig Village, Texas (Greater Houston)

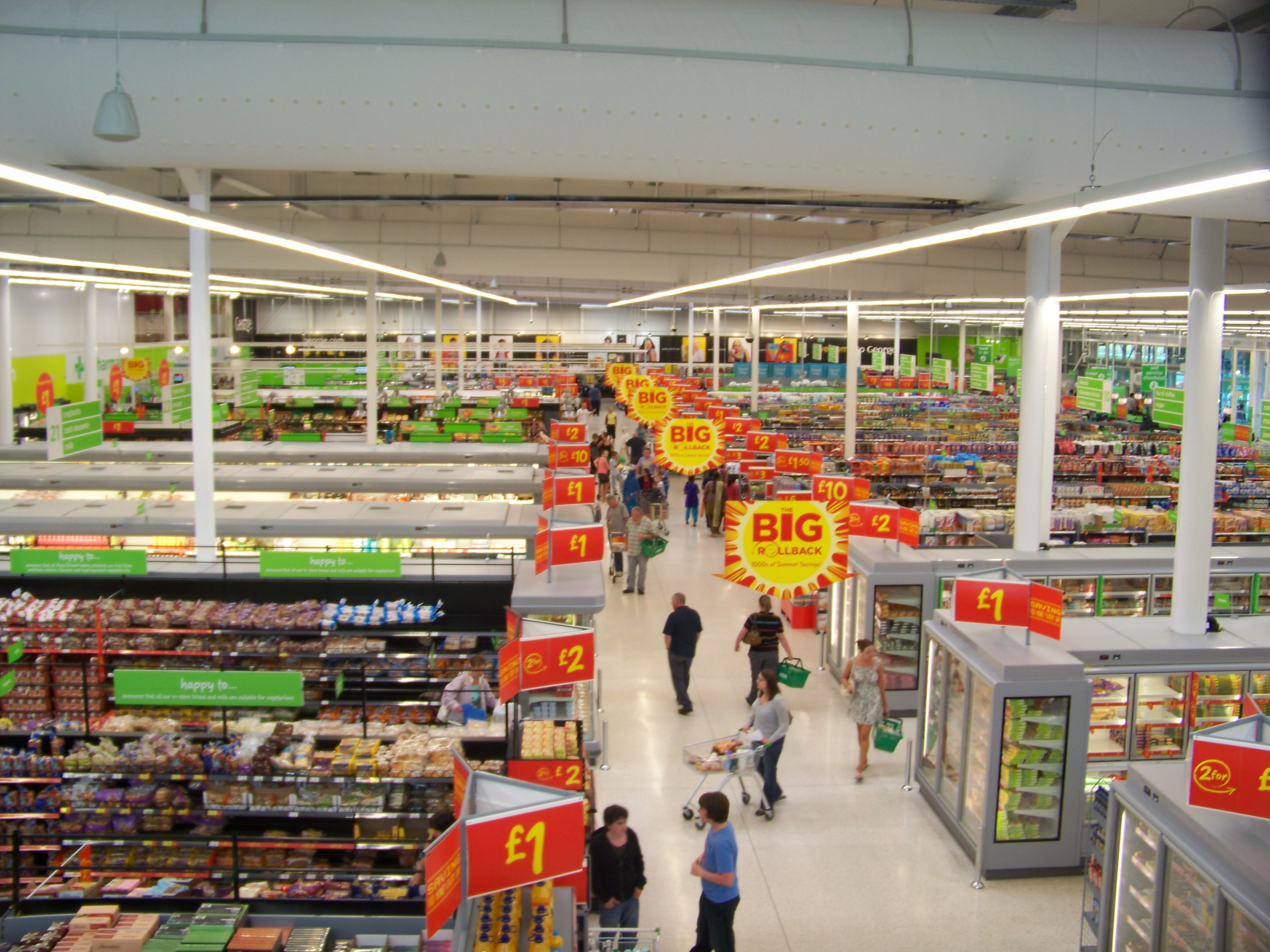
Inside an Asda supermarket in Keighley, West Yorkshire

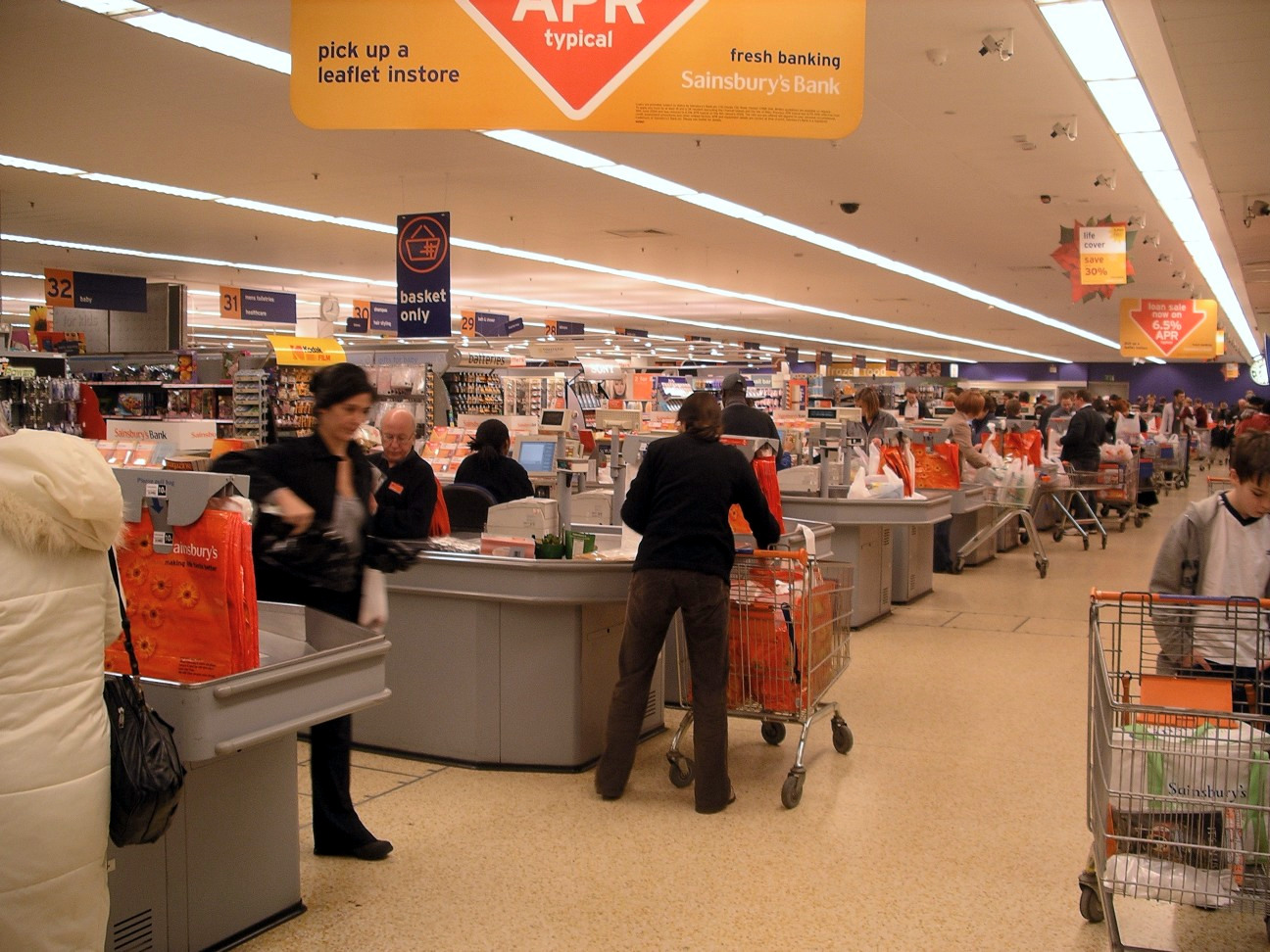
UK's Sainsbury's supermarket checkouts

Most merchandise is already packaged when it arrives at the supermarket. Packages are placed on shelves, arranged in aisles and sections according to type of item. Some items, such as fresh produce, are stored in bins. Those requiring an intact cold chain are in temperature-controlled display cases.

While branding and store advertising will differ from company to company, the layout of a supermarket remains virtually unchanged. Although big companies spend time giving consumers a pleasant shopping experience, the design of a supermarket is directly connected to the in-store marketing that supermarkets must conduct to get shoppers to spend more money while there.

Every aspect of the store is mapped out and attention is paid to color, wording and surface texture. The overall layout of a supermarket is a visual merchandising project that plays a major role. Stores can creatively use a layout to alter customers' perceptions of the atmosphere. Alternatively, they can enhance the store's atmospherics through visual communications (signs and graphics), lighting, colors, and scents. For example, to give a sense of the supermarket being healthy, fresh produce is deliberately located at the front of the store. In terms of bakery items, supermarkets usually dedicate 30 to 40 feet of store space to the bread aisle.

Supermarkets are designed to "give each product section a sense of individual difference and this is evident in the design of what is called the anchor departments; fresh produce, dairy, delicatessen, meat and the bakery". Each section has different floor coverings, style, lighting and sometimes even individual services counters to allow shoppers to feel as if there are a number of markets within this one supermarket.

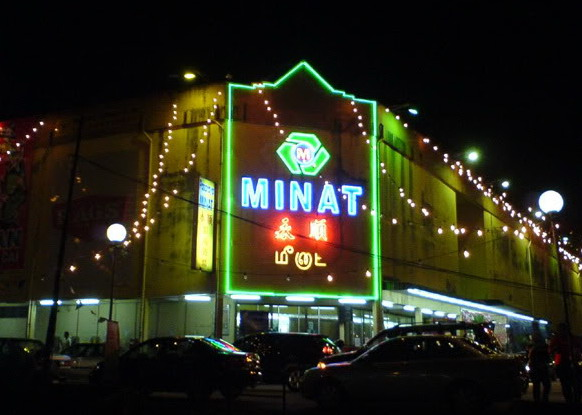
Exterior of a supermarket in Kulim, Kedah, Malaysia

Marketers use well-researched techniques to try to control purchasing behavior. The layout of a supermarket is considered by some to consist of a few rules of thumb and three layout principles. The high-draw products are placed in separate areas of the store to keep drawing the consumer through the store. High impulse and high margin products are placed in the most predominant areas to grab attention. Power products are placed on both sides of the aisle to create increased product awareness, and end caps are used to receive a high exposure of a certain product whether on special, promotion or in a campaign, or a new line.

The first principle of the layout is circulation. Circulation is created by arranging product so the supermarket can control the traffic flow of the consumer. Along with this path, there will be high-draw, high-impulse items that will influence the consumer to make purchases which they did not originally intend. Service areas such as restrooms are placed in a location which draws the consumer past certain products to create extra buys. Necessity items such as bread and milk are found at the rear of the store to increase the start of circulation. Cashiers' desks are placed in a position to promote circulation. In most supermarkets, the entrance will be on the right-hand side because some research suggests that consumers who travel in a counter-clockwise direction spend more. However, other researchers have argued that consumers moving in a clockwise direction can form better mental maps of the store leading to higher sales in turn.

The second principle of the layout is coordination. Coordination is the organized arrangement of product that promotes sales. Products such as fast-selling and slow-selling lines are placed in strategic positions in aid of the overall sales plan. Managers sometimes place different items in fast-selling places to increase turnover or to promote a new line.

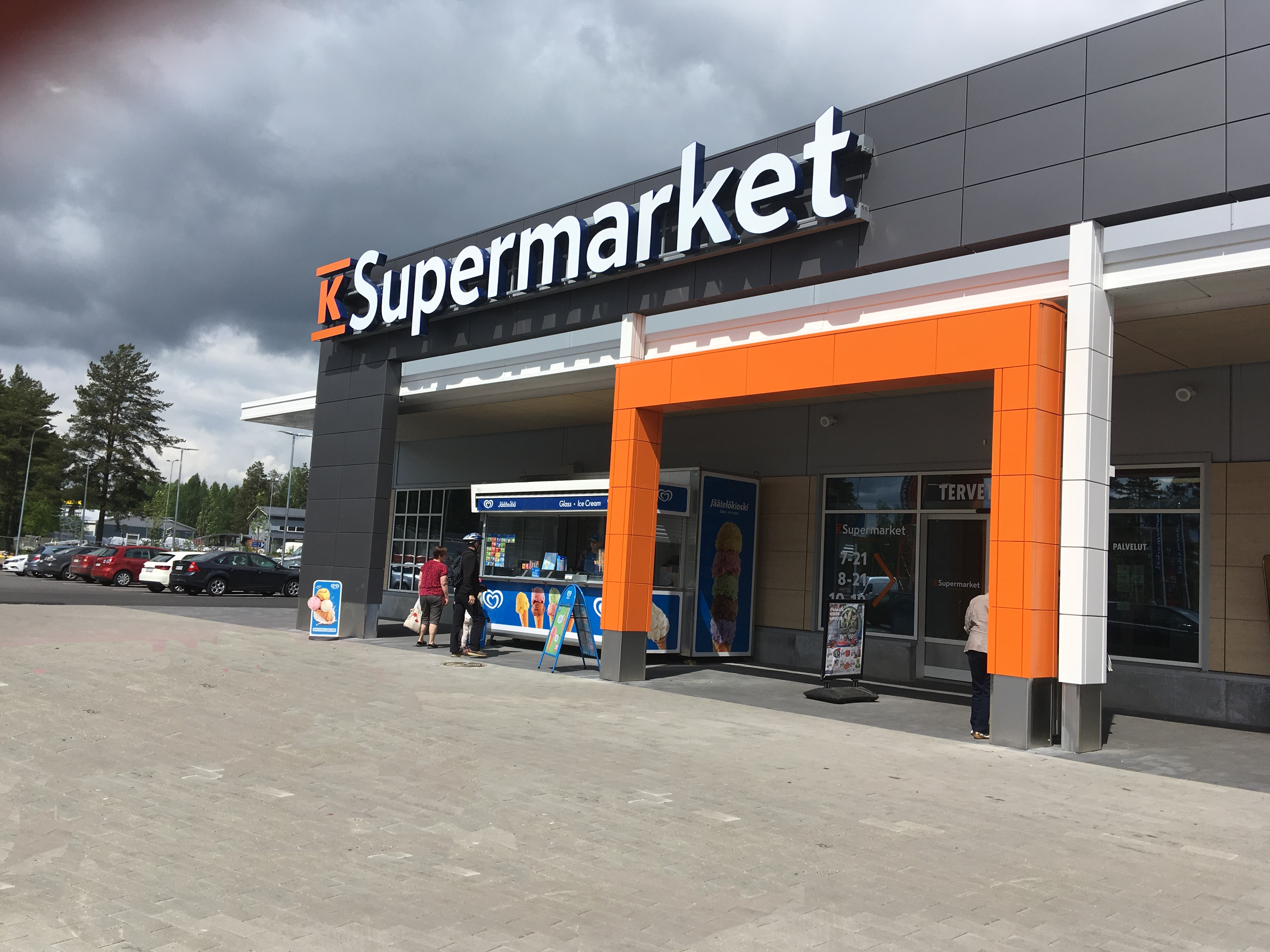
K-Supermarket in Tarmola, Porvoo, Finland

The third principle is consumer convenience. The layout of a supermarket is designed to create a high degree of convenience to the consumer to make the shopping experience pleasant and increase customer spending. This is done through the character of merchandising and product placement. There are many different ideas and theories in relation to layout and how product layout can influence the purchases made. One theory suggests that certain products are placed together or near one another that are of a similar or complementary nature to increase the average customer spend. This strategy is used to create cross-category sales similarity. In other words, the toothpaste is next to or adjacent the toothbrushes and the tea and coffee are down the same aisle as the sweet biscuits. These products complement one another and placing them near is one-way marketers try to increase purchases.

For vertical placement, cheap generic brands tend to be on the lowest shelves, products appealing to children are placed at the mid-thigh level, and the most profitable brands are placed at eye level.

The fourth principle is the use of color psychology, and the locations of the food, similar to its use in fast food branding.

Consumer psychologists suggest that most buyers tend to enter the store and shop to their right first. Some supermarkets, therefore, choose to place the entrance to the left-hand side as the consumer will likely turn right upon entry, and this allows the consumer to do a full counter-clockwise circle around the store before returning to the checkouts. This suggests that supermarket marketers should use this theory to their advantage by placing their temporary displays of products on the right-hand side to entice you to make an unplanned purchase. Furthermore, aisle ends are extremely popular with product manufacturers, who pay top dollar to have their products located there. These aisle ends are used to lure customers into making a snap purchase and to also entice them to shop down the aisle. The most obvious place supermarket layout influences consumers are at the checkout. Small displays of candy, magazines, and drinks are located at each checkout to tempt shoppers while they wait to be served.

== Criticisms ==
The large scale of supermarkets, while often improving cost and efficiency for customers, can place significant economic pressure on suppliers and smaller shopkeepers. Supermarkets often generate considerable food waste, although modern technologies such as biomethanation units may be able to process the waste into an economical source of energy. Also, purchases tracking may help as supermarkets then become better able to size their stock (of perishable goods), reducing food spoilage.

In 1997, the Reverend John Papworth attracted international attention with his criticism of giant supermarkets. For him, they are "places of evil and temptation", destroyers of local communities, and shoplifting in them would be illegal but not sinful.

== See also ==
- Hypermarket – Physically large retail establishment
- List of grocers
- Short food supply chains – Relatively short distance between food production and consumption
  - Farmers' market – Market featuring foods sold directly by farmers to consumerss
- Types of retail outlets – Sale of goods and services
