= Sheriff of Crail =

Sheriff of Crail, Scotland

The Sheriff of Crail was historically the royal official responsible for enforcing law and order in Crail, Scotland.

The sheriffdom of Crail appears to have been created in the mid 12th century and seems to have been dissolved and incorporated into the sheriffdom of Fife in the 13th century.

== Sheriffs of Crail ==
- William (1163)
- Geoffrey de Inverkunglas (1223)
