= John Krebs, Baron Krebs =

British zoologist

The Right Honourable The Lord Krebs FRS FMedSci
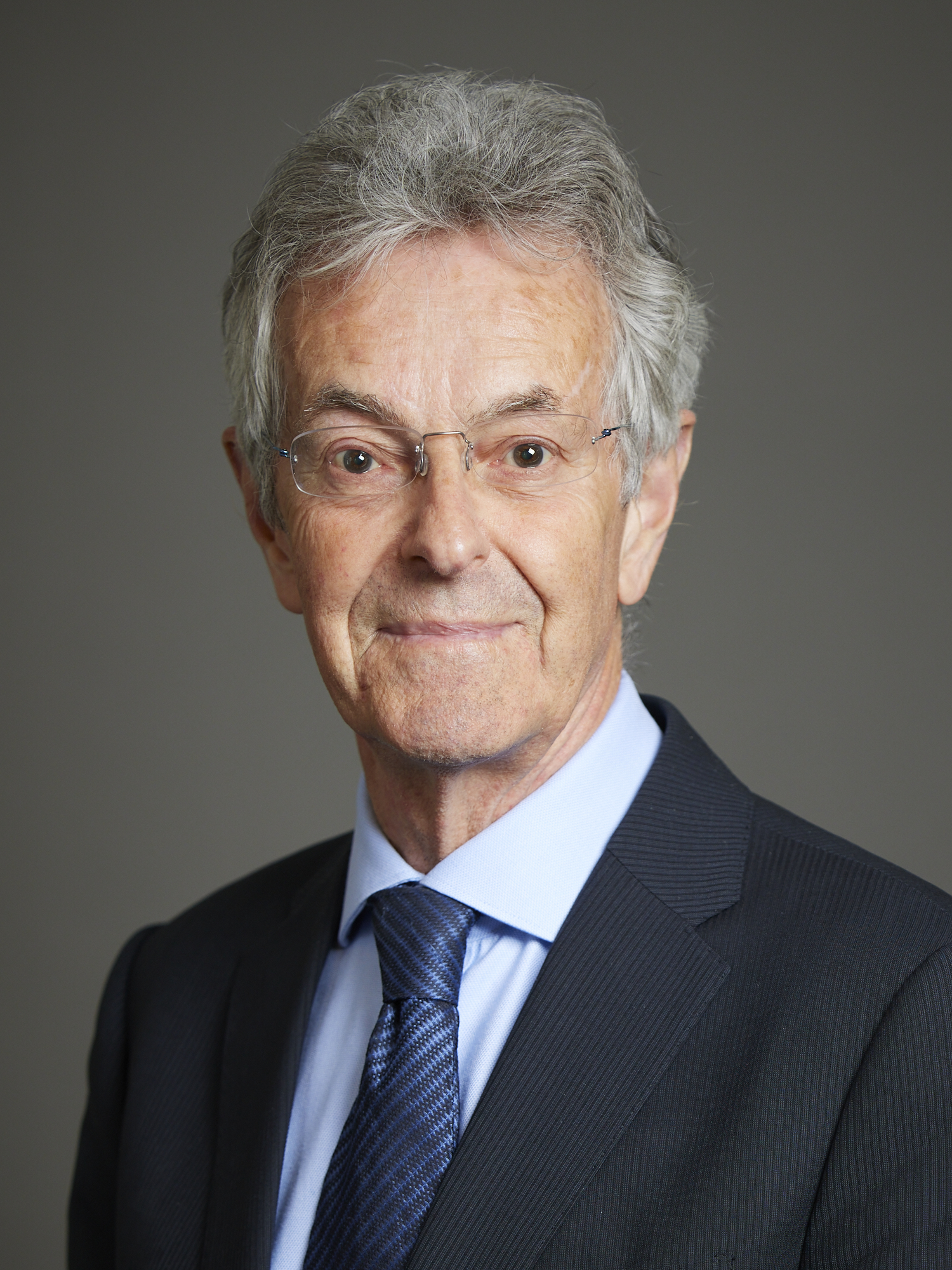
- Krebs' official parliamentary photo
- Born: John Richard Krebs; 11 April 1945 (age 81)
- Education: City of Oxford High School for Boys
- Alma mater: University of Oxford (MA, DPhil)
- Spouses: Katharine Anne Fullerton (m. 1968–2012) Sarah Margaret Phibbs (m. 2013)
- Children: 2
- Awards: Frink Medal (1996); Knight Bachelor (1999); Croonian Medal (2004)
- Scientific career
- Fields: Ornithology; Ethology
- Workplaces: University of Oxford; Natural Environment Research Council; Food Standards Agency; University of British Columbia; University College of North Wales
- Thesis: A study of territorial behaviour in the Great tit Parus major L. (1970)
- Doctoral advisor: Mike Cullen

Member of the House of Lords
- Lord Temporal
- Life peerage 28 March 2007
- Website: www.jesus.ox.ac.uk/fellows-and-staff/fellows/lord-krebs

John Richard Krebs, Baron Krebs (born 11 April 1945) is an English zoologist specialising in the behavioural ecology of birds. He was principal of Jesus College, Oxford, from 2005 until 2015 and president of the British Science Association from 2012 to 2013.

== Early life and education ==
Krebs was educated at the City of Oxford High School, and the University of Oxford where he was a student at Pembroke College, Oxford. He was awarded a Bachelor of Arts (BA) degree in 1966 (converted to an Oxford MA in 1970) and a DPhil degree in 1970 for research on territorial behaviour in great tits supervised by Mike Cullen.

== Career and research ==
Krebs has held appointments at the University of British Columbia and the University College of North Wales, before returning to Oxford as a University lecturer in Zoology, with a fellowship at Wolfson College, Oxford. From 1988 to 2005, he held a Royal Society Research Professorship in the Department of Zoology, University of Oxford, where he was based at Pembroke College, Oxford. He was chief executive of the Natural Environment Research Council (NERC) from 1994 until 1999.

From 2000 to 2005 he was the first chairman of the British Food Standards Agency.

On 15 February 2007, the House of Lords Appointments Commission announced that he was to become a non-party political (cross-bench) life peer. Krebs was principal of Jesus College, Oxford from 2005 to 2015.

Krebs's career has been both productive and influential. His speciality is ornithology. His publications include more than 130 peer-reviewed scientific papers, 5 books, and 130 book chapters, reviews, or popular science pieces. They have introduced new methods to the science of ornithology, including the use of optimality models to predict foraging behaviour, and, more recently, techniques from neurobiology and experimental psychology to assess the mental capacities of birds and to relate these to particular regions of the brain.

In 2000, during his chairmanship of the Food Standards Agency, Krebs criticised the organic food movement, saying that people buying such food were "not getting value for money, in my opinion and in the opinion of the Food Standards Agency, if they think they're buying food with extra nutritional quality or extra safety. We don't have the evidence to support those claims."

Having led the randomised badger culling in the United Kingdom trials, Krebs became one of the UK's leading experts on bovine tuberculosis caused by Mycobacterium bovis. The findings of the trials led him to oppose further badger culling in 2012 and he contributed to a paper on the subject written by centre-right think tank The Bow Group.

From 2006 to 2007, Krebs was a member of the Nuffield Council on Bioethics, where he chaired the Working Party on Public Health. He took up the chairmanship of the National Network of Science Learning Centres in 2007. He was a member of the independent, statutory body the Committee on Climate Change, and chairman of its Adaptation Sub-Committee, from 2009 to 2017.

=== Awards and honours ===
In 2005 Krebs gave the Royal Institution Christmas Lectures on The Truth About Food.

For his scientific research and leadership he has been awarded honorary doctorates by 16 universities. He was elected to the American Philosophical Society in 2000.

He was elected a Fellow of the Royal Society (FRS) in 1984 and a Fellow of the Academy of Medical Sciences (FMedSci) in 2004. He was knighted in the 1999 New Year Honours for services to Behavioural Ecology.

In 2007, he was created a life peer, taking the title of Baron Krebs, of Wytham in the County of Oxfordshire.

in 2022, he was awarded an honoary degree from Bangor University for outstanding scholarship and innovation.

=== Publications ===
Krebs's publications include:

- Foraging Theory
- Foraging Behavior
- An Introduction to Behavioural Ecology
- Behavioural Ecology: An Evolutionary Approach
- Animal signals: information or manipulation? (with Richard Dawkins)
- Animal signals: mind-reading and manipulation (with Richard Dawkins)
- Arms races between and within species
- The Croonian Lecture 2004 Risk: Food, fact and fantasy
- A larger hippocampus is associated with longer-lasting spatial memory
- Hippocampal growth and attrition in birds affected by experience
- Hippocampal specialization of food-storing birds

== Personal life ==
Krebs is the son of Hans Krebs, the German biochemist who described the uptake and release of energy in cells, known as the Krebs cycle.

Krebs was married to Katharine Anne Fullerton from 1968 to 2012, and married Sarah Margaret Phibbs in 2013. He has two children from his first marriage.

Orders of precedence in the United Kingdom
Preceded by The Lord Hameed	Gentlemen; Baron Krebs	Followed by The Lord Mawson
