= King Kullen =

American supermarket chain

King Kullen Grocery Co., Inc.
- Type: Private
- Industry: Retail (Grocery); Pharmacy
- Founded: August 4, 1930 (96 years ago)
- Founder: Michael J. Cullen
- Headquarters: Hauppauge, New York, U.S.
- Number of locations: 28 (24 King Kullen; 4 Wild by Nature) (2026)
- Area served: Long Island, New York
- Key people: Joseph Brown (President and COO); Tracey Cullen (Sr. VP of Company Operations)
- Products: Bakery, dairy, deli, frozen foods, grocery, meat, pharmacy, produce, seafood
- Revenue: ▲US$ 600 million (2026)
- Owner: Giunta's Meat Farms
- Number of employees: 3,200 (2026)
- Website: kingkullen.com

King Kullen Grocery Co., Inc., is an American supermarket chain based in Hauppauge, New York. Founded by Michael J. Cullen on August 4, 1930, the company operated 27 locations across Long Island as of 2021.

== History ==
King Kullen was founded by Michael J. Cullen, a former Kroger employee who wanted to design a more modern supermarket. While acting as branch manager of the Herrin, Illinois, Kroger Grocery & Baking Company stores, managing 94 small stores, Cullen wrote a six-page letter to John Bonham, a Kroger vice-president, proposing a new type of food store with a focus on low prices, cash sales, and without delivery services, in larger, low-rent storefronts with ample parking. He described what he envisioned as "monstrous stores, size of some to be about forty feet wide and hundred and thirty to a hundred and sixty feet deep, and they ought to be located one to three blocks off the high rent district with plenty of parking space, and some to be operated as a semi-self-service store – twenty percent service and eighty percent self-service."

In his proposal, Cullen suggested that this new type of store could achieve ten times the volume and profits of the average Kroger or A&P, making Kroger "the greatest chain grocery concern on the face of the earth."

After Cullen's letter went unanswered, he resigned and moved with his wife, Nan, and their children to Long Island, to pursue the concept. Cullen leased a vacant garage at 171-06 Jamaica Avenue, on the corner of 171st Street and Jamaica Avenue in the Jamaica neighborhood of Queens, near a busy shopping district. The store, named "King Kullen", opened on August 4, 1930. After operating for 80 years in New York City, King Kullen left that market in 2011 with the sale of its three remaining New York City stores in Eltingville, Graniteville, and Greenridge on Staten Island.

Customers reportedly came from 100 miles away to shop at the first King Kullen. The first store was ten times larger than the Atlantic & Pacific Tea Company stores, for example. A second store was opened a few miles away from the first, on Jamaica Avenue in Bellaire, Queens. Within two years of opening, the company operated eight stores, with sales totaling $2.9 million. The early stores ranged in size, between 5200 and 6400 square feet. Within six years of opening, King Kullen had 15 locations. By 1952, King Kullen had 30 stores, then ranging in size from 10,000 to 15,000 square feet.

Cullen died at Flushing Hospital on April 24, 1936, at the age of 52, from peritonitis following an appendectomy. His widow, Nan, took over King Kullen, becoming chairman of the board. She was joined by her sons, James A. Cullen (then 24) and John B. Cullen (then 15).

In 1937, King Kullen stores began providing shopping carts. In the 1950s, conveyor belts, air conditioning, automatically opening exterior doors, tile floors (easier to clean than wood), and in-store music systems were introduced. In the 1960s, King Kullen began stocking non-food items. In 1966, King Kullen purchased the nine-store Blue Jay Markets, a Suffolk County-based grocery chain. Blue Jay had been owned and operated by Frank Radau of Smithtown. In 1969, King Kullen bought the Hinsch Produce Co. In 1982, King Kullen introduced in-store bakeries.

King Kullen remains owned and operated by the Cullen family, with second-, third- and fourth-generation family members working for the company. During the 1980s, former New York City Councilman Jack Muratori served as a King Kullen board member.

In 1995, King Kullen opened Wild by Nature, an independent subsidiary. Wild by Nature is a grocery store marketed as selling wholesome, natural products. Wild by Nature has four locations (Setauket, Huntington, Hampton Bays, and Oceanside).

On January 4, 2019, it was announced that Stop & Shop (a division of Ahold Delhaize) would purchase King Kullen's 32 stores and its 5 Wild by Nature stores. On April 17, 2020, it was announced that the deal set to close on April 30, 2020. On June 10, 2020, it was announced that the acquisition had been terminated and that King Kullen would remain independent due to "unforeseen changes in the marketplace.".

On July 30, 2026, it was announced that Giunta's Meat Farms, a family owned supermarket chain also located on Long Island, would be acquiring King Kullen's 24 stores and its 4 Wild by Nature stores. The deal closed on October 3rd, 2026.

== Locations ==
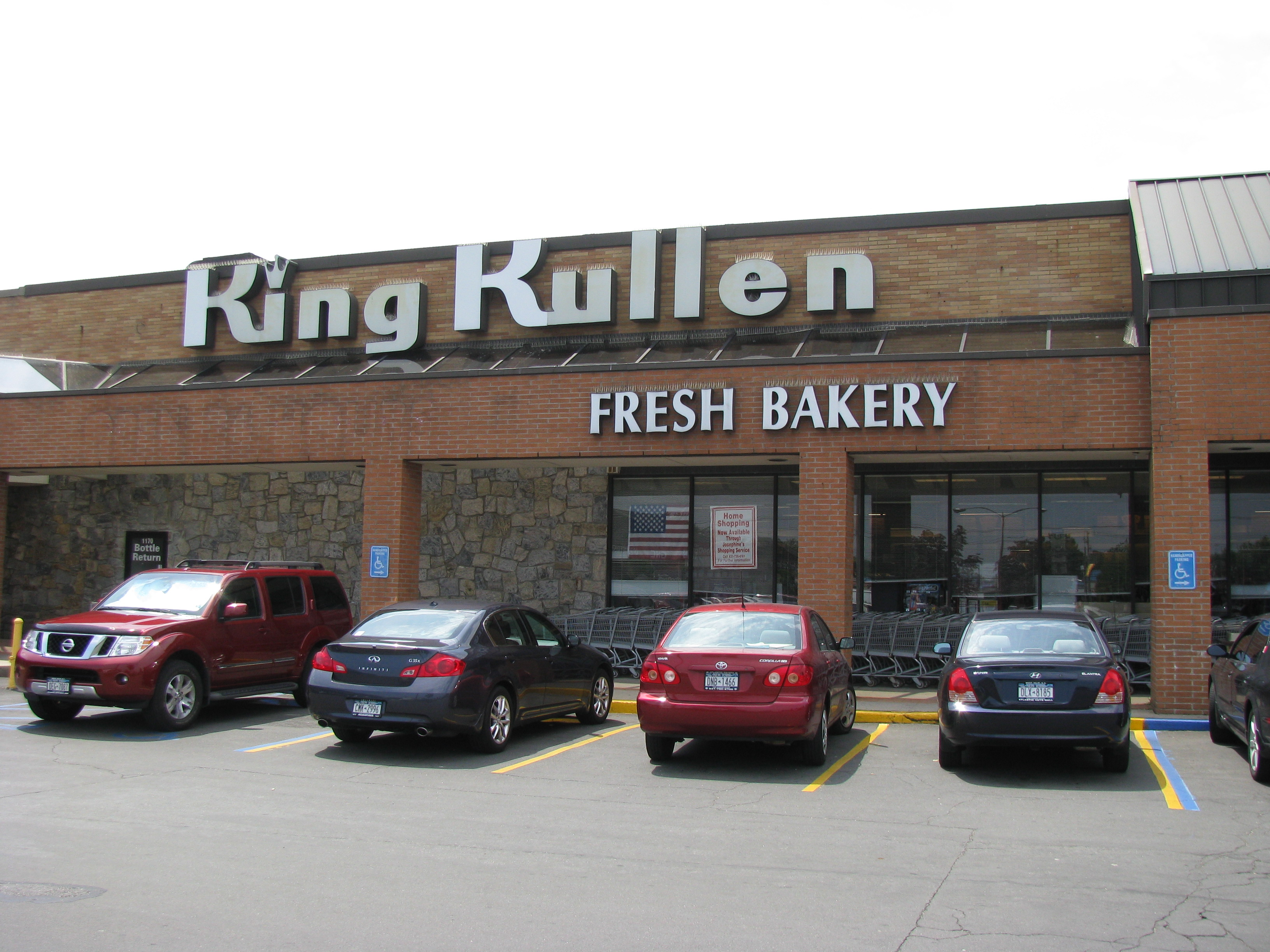
Exterior of a former King Kullen location in North Babylon

King Kullen currently operates 24 locations in the Nassau and Suffolk counties of Long Island.

Nine King Kullen stores operate full-service pharmacy departments, with online refills available.

Four King Kullen locations offer online grocery shopping, with delivery and pickup. King Kullen's delivery range covers much of Nassau County, many parts of Suffolk County (including Fire Island), and some neighborhoods in Queens.

== Headquarters ==
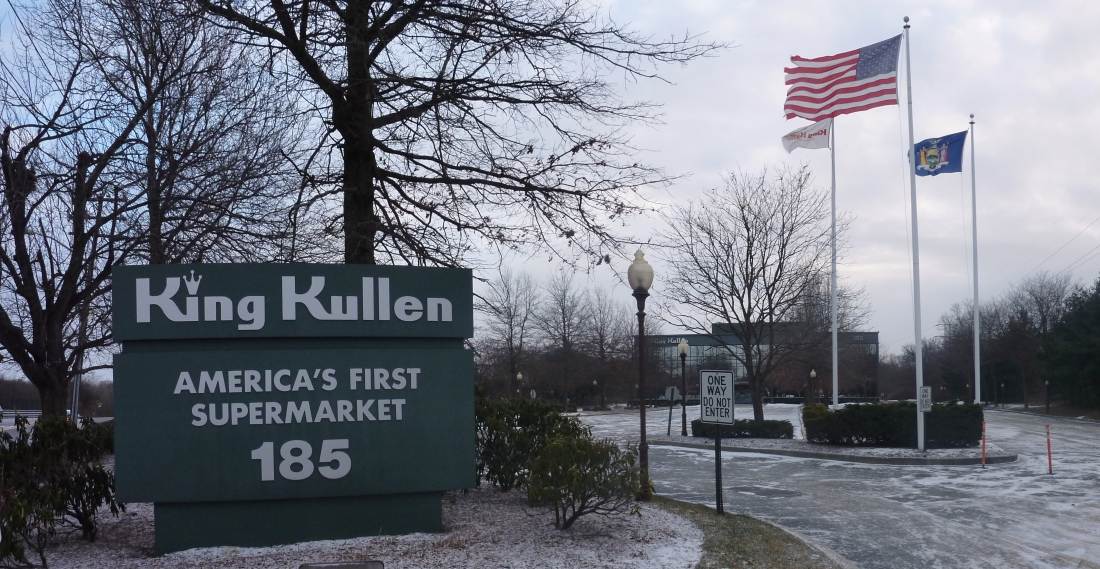
Former King Kullen headquarters in Bethpage.

King Kullen's first headquarters were established at its second store, on Jamaica Avenue in Bellaire, Queens. The offices were located in the northwest corner of the store, in a converted garage. In 1940, a combination warehouse and office was built at 178-02 Liberty Avenue, Queens (warehouse on ground level; offices on upper floor).

In 1961, King Kullen built a 95,000 square foot warehouse at 1194 Prospect Avenue in New Cassel, New York, and moved the Liberty Avenue headquarters to that location. In May 2000, King Kullen moved its corporate headquarters again to a three-story building at 185 Central Avenue, Bethpage, New York. In December 2020, King Kullen moved out of its Bethpage headquarters (after selling the building to a White Plains venture-capital firm) and moved to a new, rented office in Hauppauge.
