= William Cullen (disambiguation) =

William Cullen (1710–1790) was a Scottish physician and chemist.

William Cullen may also refer to:

== Law ==
- William James Cullen, Lord Cullen (1859–1941), Scottish judge, Senator of the College of Justice from 1909
- William Cullen, Baron Cullen of Whitekirk (born 1935), senior member of the Scottish Judiciary
- William Portus Cullen (1855–1935), chief-justice in New South Wales, Australia

== Sports ==
- William Cullen (cricketer) (1887–1945), Australian cricketer
- William John Cullen (1894–1960), Irish rugby international
- William Goodsir-Cullen (1907–1994), Indian field hockey player

== Other ==
- Bill Cullen (1920–1990), American television and radio personality
- Bill Cullen (businessman) (born 1942), Irish businessman, philanthropist, and media personality
- William Cullen (Illinois politician) (1826–1914), U.S. representative from Illinois
- William Cullen (Resident) (1785–1862), British Army Officer

== See also ==
- Will Cullen Hart (born 1971), musician
- William Cullen Bryant (1794–1878), American writer
- Lord Cullen (disambiguation)
