= David Barclay of Cairns =

Scottish noble

David de Berkley of Cairns/Carny was a 13th-14th century Scottish noble.

David was the son of Sir David Berkley.

He was a supporter of Robert de Brus. David was the Sheriff of Fife in 1295. He swore fealty and homage to King Edward I of England on 28 August 1296 at Berwick.

He again swore fealty and homage to King Edward I of England on 14 March 1304 at St Andrews. He was granted the lordship of Avoch in 1305, however was stripped of the title when he again rebelled. David was taken prisoner at the Battle of Methven on 19 June 1306 and appears to have been released shortly afterwards, as he does not appear on any prisoner list.

David took part in the campaign against William, Earl of Ross in 1308 with King Robert I of Scotland. He was killed on 24 June 1314 at the Battle of Bannockburn.

== Family ==
David is known to have had the following issue:

- David Barclay of Carny and Kindersleith, jure uxoris Lord Brechin
