= Aeneas James George Mackay =

Scottish lawyer and academic

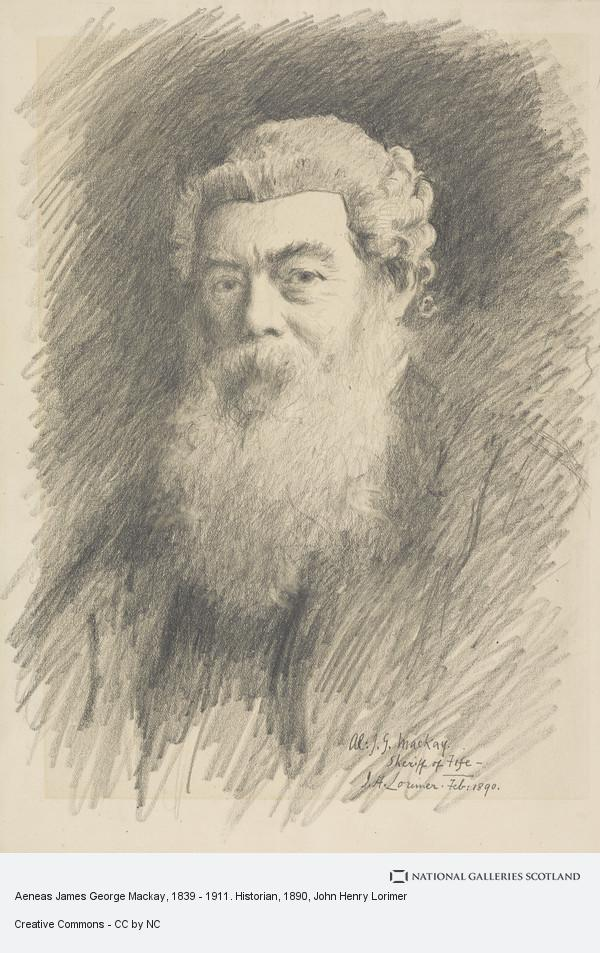
Aeneas James George Mackay, 1890 drawing

Aeneas James George Mackay (3 November 1839 – 10 June 1911) was a Scottish lawyer and academic, known as a legal and historical writer.

== Life ==
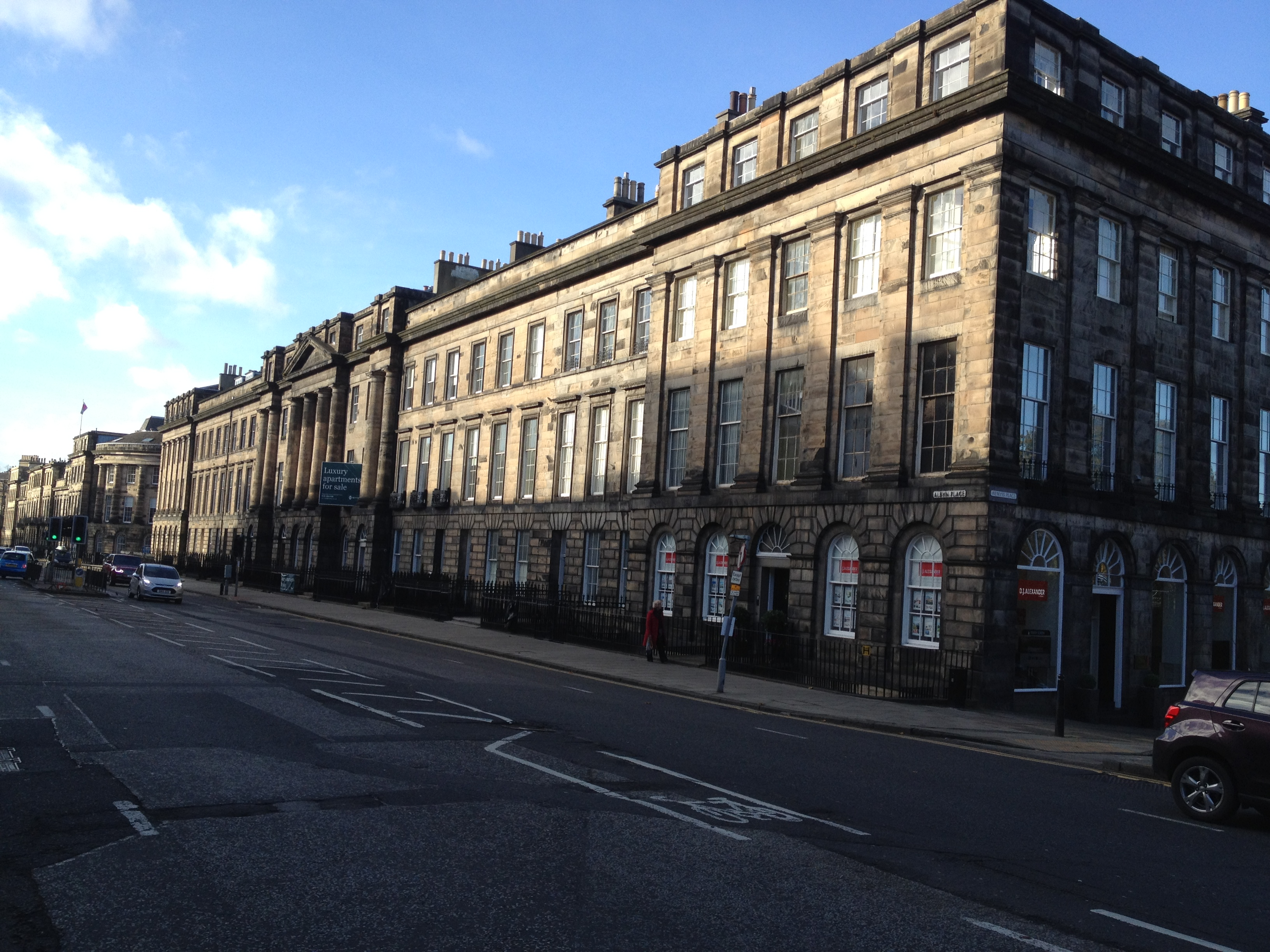
Albyn Place, Edinburgh

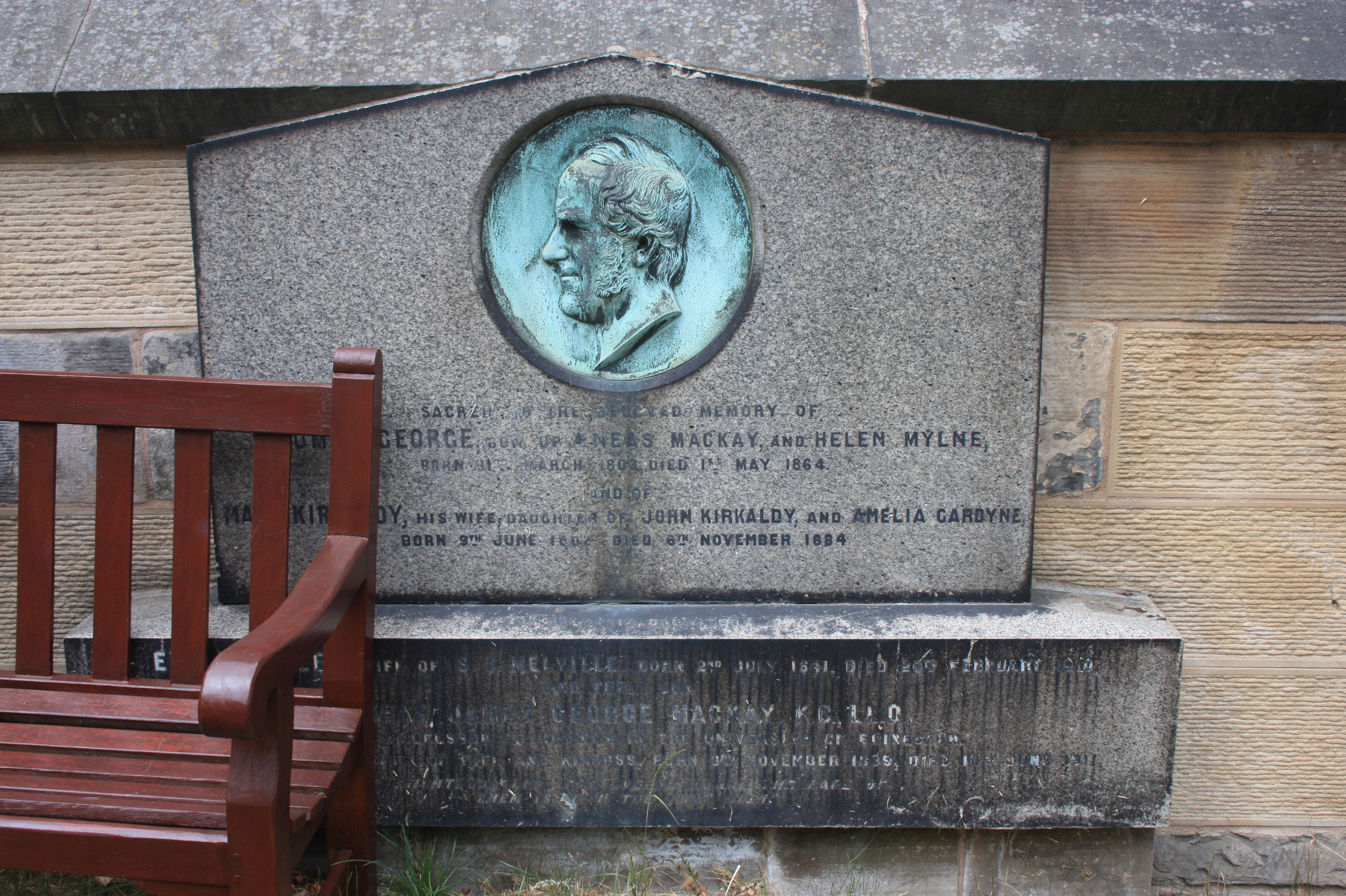
The grave of Aeneas J G Mackay, St Johns Churchyard, Princes Street, Edinburgh

Born at 7 Albyn Place on the Moray Estate in Edinburgh on 3 November 1839 and was son of Mary, daughter of John Kirkcaldy of Baldovie, Forfarshire and Thomas George Mackay, writer to the signet. He was paternal grandson of Aeneas Mackay, a famous Edinburgh lawyer.

He was educated at Edinburgh Academy and King's College, London, where he gained distinction in divinity and history. He went on to University College, Oxford, where he graduated BA in 1862, proceeding MA in 1865, and then at Heidelberg University, completing his legal curriculum at the University of Edinburgh, where he was one of the first to obtain the degree of LL.B.

Mackay was admitted advocate at the Scottish bar in 1864, and attained repute in consultation. He devoted time to studies in law and history, and in 1874 he succeeded Cosmo Innes as professor of constitutional law and history in the University of Edinburgh.

In 1881 Mackay was appointed advocate-depute and resigned the professorship. In 1886 he was made Sheriff of Fife and Kinross, retaining the office till 1901 when failing health compelled him to resign.

Mackay was granted an honorary doctorate (LLD) by the University of Edinburgh in 1882, a Queen's Counsel in 1897, and was a fellow of King's College, London.

He was one of the founders of the Scottish History Society in 1885, and was an active member of the Scottish Text Society.

He died at 7 Albyn Place, his birthplace, on 10 June 1911. He is buried with his parents in the churchyard of St John's Episcopal Church, Edinburgh on Princes Street, close to his home. The grave lies on the upper burial terrace closest to Princes Street. The grave bears a medallion portrait of his father.

== Works ==
Mackay's major work was The Practice of the Court of Session (2 vols. 1877–9), which became a standard authority.

He was the author of the articles on "equity" in both Green's Encyclopædia of the Law of Scotland (Volume V, 1897) and the Encyclopædia of the Laws of Scotland (Volume VI, 1928).

Other works were:

- Memoir of Sir James Dalrymple of Stair, 1873.
- William Dunbar: a Study in the Poetry and History of Scotland, 1889.
- A Sketch of the History of Fife and Kinross, Cupar Fife, 1890.
- A Century of Scottish Proverbs and Sayings, in Prose and Rhyme, current in Fife, Cupar Fife, 1891.
- Manual of Practice in the Court of Session, Edinburgh, 1893.
- A History of Fife and Kinross ("County Histories" series), Edinburgh, 1896.

For the Scottish History Society Mackay wrote a life of John Mair, for Archibald Constable's translation of Mair's History of Great Britain (1892); and for the Scottish Text Society he supplied in 1884 an introduction and appendix for an edition of the Poems of William Dunbar, and also edited Lindsay of Pitscottie's Chronicles of Scotland in 1899. He wrote articles on Scottish subjects for the Dictionary of National Biography and the Encyclopædia Britannica. During the final ten years of his life illness condemned him to inactivity. His last works were connected with the statute law revision for Scotland, for which he prepared an account of pre-Union legislation, issued as a Blue Book.

== Family ==
In 1891 Mackay married Lilian Alina, daughter of Colonel Charles W. St. John, 94th regiment. They had no children.

== Notes ==
Attribution

This article incorporates text from a publication now in the public domain: Lee, Sidney, ed. (1912). "Mackay, Æneas James George". Dictionary of National Biography (2nd supplement). Vol. 2. London: Smith, Elder & Co.
