= Geoffrey de Inverkunglas =

Scottish noble

Geoffrey de Inverkunglas was a 12th-13th century Scottish noble who was the Sheriff of Perth, Crail and Fife.

Geoffrey was the son of Richard, the Steward of Kinghorn. Geoffrey was active during the later stages of the reign of King William the Lion of Scotland. He was granted the lands of Balwearie, Fife, confirmed by King William. He died c.1230 and was succeeded by his son Richard de Balwearie.
