= David Cullen =

David Cullen may refer to:

- David Cullen (basketball) (born 1969), Irish basketball player
- David Cullen (ice hockey) (born 1976), Canadian ice hockey defenceman
- David Cullen (politician) (born 1960), Wisconsin State Assemblyman
- David Cullen (musician) (born 1959), guitarist
- David Mark Cullen, British general
- Dave Cullen, American writer, author of Columbine
