= Astor Market =

Market in Manhattan, New York

Coordinates: 40.793826°N 73.972808°W

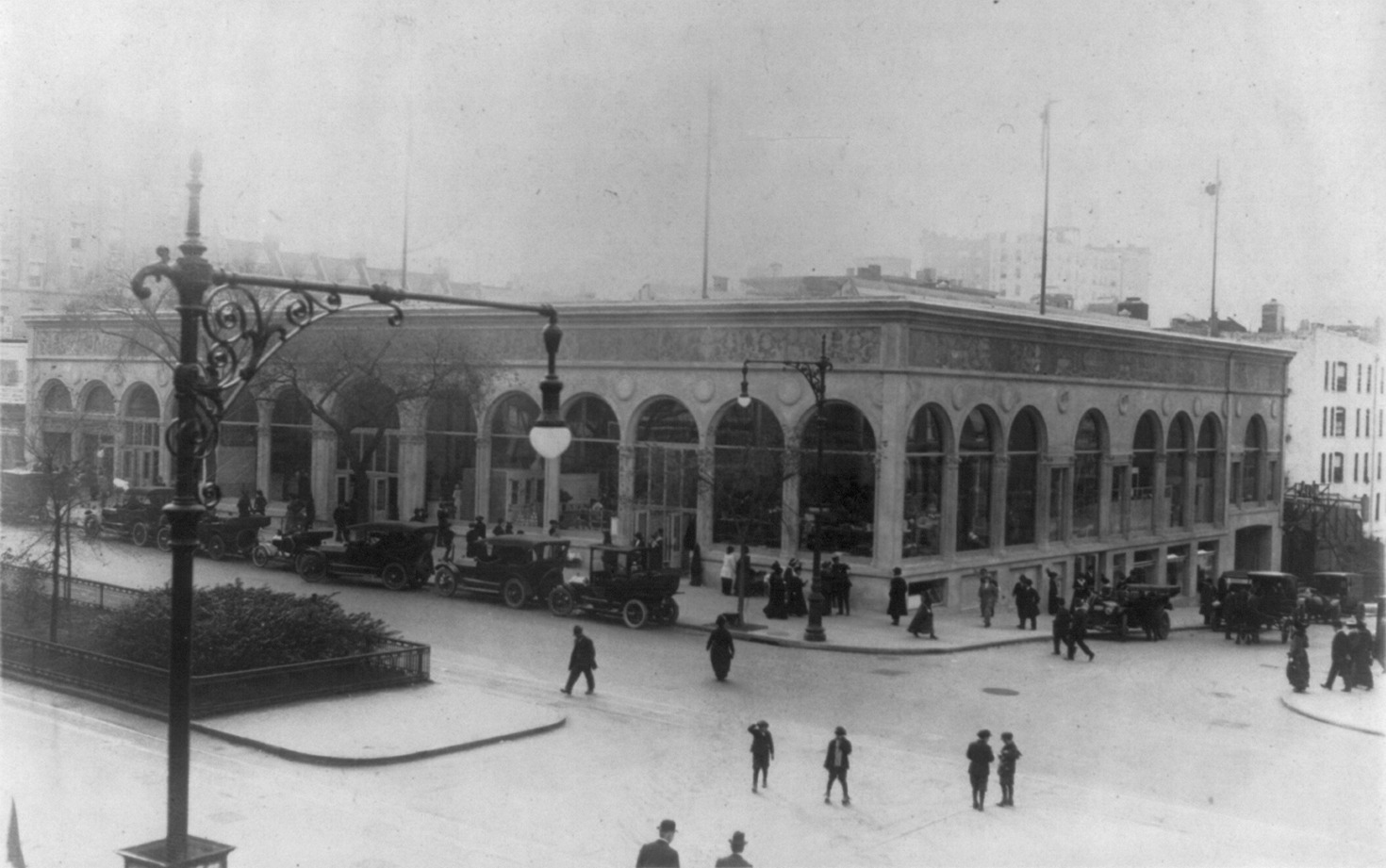
- Astor Market at 95th Street and Broadway in Manhattan in 1915
- Interactive map of the Astor Market area

General information
- Status: Demolished
- Location: New York City
- Inaugurated: 1915
- Closed: 1917
- Demolished: after 1917

Design and construction
- Architect: Tracy and Swartwout

The Astor Market was an indoor public market built in 1915 at 95th Street and Broadway on the Upper West Side of Manhattan, New York City. It was financed by Vincent Astor with between $750,000 and $1,000,000.

== History ==
It was designed by Tracy and Swartwout in 1915 and financed by Vincent Astor who wanted to provide fresh produce at lower prices for the people of Manhattan. The frieze was a mural by William Mackay. Jules Guérin created banners for the flagpoles that were placed on the roof. The market closed in 1917 and was later demolished.

At the time of the market's demise, one published account summarized the causes of its failure as follows:

Laudable as were the motives of the would-be reformer, the Astor Market, like other similar experiments, failed because its founder failed to consider the whims of human nature. One can count on his fingers the number of grocery and produce stores which have succeeded in attracting trade from any considerable distance to purchase staple articles of food. People will come into the shopping district to compare values on rugs, furniture and dresses, but not on oranges, Bread and fish. This is an age in which convenience and service are as vital to the grocer's success as good merchandise and an attractive store. Most people, on account of service and convenience, prefer to buy at the neighborhood corner grocery, with the result that in this country there is one grocery store for every 400 people.
