= Sheriff of Fife and Kinross =

Office of sheriff in Scotland

There are two distinct sheriffdoms associated with the region of Fife in Scotland. In 1881, the administrative sheriffdom was combined with the former sheriffdom of Kinross, resulting in the establishment of the Sheriff of Fife and Kinross. This combined sheriffdom existed until 1975, when it was largely incorporated into the new, larger sheriffdom of Tayside, Central and Fife.

The administrative Sheriffs of Fife had the duty of upholding law and order in Fife, and ensuring that criminals were brought to justice. Until 1748, these administrative sheriffdoms were predominantly held hereditarily. However, after the Jacobite uprising of 1745, they were replaced by salaried sheriff-deputes who were qualified advocates and members of the Scottish Bar.

== Sheriffs of Fife ==
- David de Wymess (c. 1170)
- Geoffrey de Inverkunglas (1213)
- John Hay of Naughton (1227–1228)
- Inghram de Balfour (1229)
- John Hay of Naughton (1233–1234)
- David de Wymess (1239)
- Ingram de Balliol (1240)
- David de Lochore (1264)
- Alexander Synton (1281)
- Hugh de Lochore (1289)
- Constantine de Lochore (1290)
- John de Valognes (1292)
- Hugh de Lochore (1293)
- David Barclay (1295)
- John de Valognes (1296)
- Duncan Balfour (-1298)
- John Balfour (1300)
- Constantine de Lochore (1304–1305)
- Richard Siward (1305)
- David Barclay (1306)
- Michael Balfour (1314–1315)
- David Barclay (1328)
- Patrick de Polwarth (1332)
- John Balfour (1344)
- David de Wymess (1358–1360)
- William Disshington (1370)
- David de Barclay (1372)
- Alan Erskine (1388)
- George Leslie (1396)
- John Lumsden of Glengirnock (1424)
- Henry of Wardlaw - 1439 - Deputy
- Robert Livingston of Drumry (1449)
- Andrew Lundy (1452)
- Andrew Sibbald (1456)
- Alexander Kennedy (1464)
- Andrew Lundy (1452)
- John Balfour (1475)
- Andrew Lundin of Balgonie (1497–1512)
- John Lindsay, 5th Lord Lindsay (at 1526)
- George Leslie, Earl of Rothes (1529–1540)
- John Murray, 2nd Earl of Atholl (1660)

Sheriffs-Depute

- 1748–1761: Hon James Leslie of Mildeans
- 1761–1780: James Dalgliesh of Scotscraig
- 1780–1799: Claud Irvine Boswell of Balmuto
- 1799–>1802: Neil Fergusson of Pitculle
- 1807–1811: David Monypenny, Lord Pitmilly
- 1811–:John Anstruther
- c.1822–1838: Andrew Clephane
- 1838–1861: Alexander Earle Monteith
- 1861–1870: Donald Mackenzie
- 1870–1881: James Arthur Crichton

== Sheriffs of Kinross ==
- John de Kinross (1264)
- John de Kinross (1290)
- Alan de Vipont (1328)
- John de Crichton (1360)
- Alan Erskine (1364)
- Robert Halket (1373)

== Sheriffs of Fife and Kinross (1881) ==
- 1881–1886: James Arthur Crichton
- 1886–1901: Aeneas James George Mackay
- 1901–1905: Charles Kincaid Mackenzie
- 1905–1906: Robert Tannahill Younger
- 1906–1909: William James Cullen, Lord Cullen KC
- 1909–1910 George Lewis MacFarlane KC
- 1910–1913: Thomas Brash Morison
- 1913–1926: James Alexander Fleming
- 1926–1937: John Charles Fenton
- 1937–1941: John Rudolph Wardlaw Burnet
- 1941–1971: John Adam Lillie
- 1971–1974: Charles Eliot Jauncey
- In 1975 the sheriffdom was largely merged into the new sheriffdom of Tayside, Central and Fife.

== See also ==
- Historical development of Scottish sheriffdoms
