= Geoff Cullen =

Australian cricketer

Personal information
- Full name: Geoffrey Ian Cullen
- Born: 16 March 1977 (age 49); Cottesloe, Western Australia
- Batting: Left-handed
- Bowling: Right-arm off-break

Domestic team information
- Years: Team
- 2000/01: Western Australia

Career statistics
Competition	FC
Matches	1
Runs scored	5
Batting average	5.00
100s/50s	0/0
Top score	5
Catches/stumpings	0/–
- Source: CricketArchive, 8 February 2013

Geoffrey Ian Cullen (born 16 March 1977) is a former professional Australian cricketer who played a single match for Western Australia during the 2000–01 season. From Perth, Cullen played matches for the state second XI and colts teams from the 1998–99 season onwards. He did not make his first-class debut until the 2000–01 season, playing a single Sheffield Shield match against Victoria in early March 2001. In the match, played at the Melbourne Cricket Ground, Cullen scored five runs in Western Australia's first innings, and did not bat in the second. Having also had a particularly successful season for Claremont–Nedlands in the local grade cricket competition, scoring 852 runs at an average of 56.80, Cullen was awarded a state contract from the Western Australian Cricket Association (WACA) for the following season. Despite being a regular selection in the second XI during both the 2001–02 and 2002–03 seasons, he did not play at senior level again. Cullen did, however, go on to spend the 2008 English season playing for South Shields in the North East Premier League, leading the team's batting averages.
