= John Hugh Cullen =

Roman Catholic priest and religious historian

John Hugh Cullen (1883–1970), was an Irish-born Catholic priest, writer and historian, who served in Australia.

Cullen was born on 14 June 1883, in Kilquade, Co. Wicklow, Ireland, to Michael Cullen and his wife Mary (née Troy).

He was educated by the Christian Brothers in Dublin, and at Mungret College, Co. Limerick awarded a BA from the Royal University of Ireland (RUI). Fr. Cullen spent four years training as a missionary priest in All Hallows College, Dublin, for the Australian Diocese of Hobart, he was ordained a priest on 24 June 1908. He continued his studies at the University of Fribourg, Switzerland. He was instrumental in the foundation of St. Joseph's School Hobart.

He contributed to a number of Catholic publications in Australia such as the Catholic Standard, Australasian Catholic Record, and founded the monthly Catholic Magazine with A. E. Warne.

As a historian he researched and wrote about the Catholic church in Tasmania, he also wrote comprehensively on Robert Willson, the first bishop of Hobart in a series of articles in the Australasian Catholic Record, which became a biography of him and is the basis of the biographical entry he wrote for the Australian Dictionary of Biography.

Two of his brothers, Arthur Cullen (1889–1939) and Joseph Cullen (1892–1951), followed him into the priesthood, also training at All Hallows, and also qualified with degrees from the National University of Ireland (which replaced the RUI).

He died on 17 November 1970, and is buried in Cornelian Bay Cemetery.

== Books ==
- Young Ireland In Exile: The Story of the Men of 48 in Tasmania by John Hugh Cullen, Dublin, 1928.
- The Australian Daughters Of Mary Aikenhead by John Hugh Cullen, Sydney, 1938.
- The Catholic Church In Tasmania by John Hugh Cullen, Launceston, 1949.
- Sisters of the Presentation 1866-1966 by Msgr John H Cullen, 1967.
