= Mick Cullen =

Scottish footballer (1931–2024)

Personal information
- Full name: Michael Joseph Cullen
- Date of birth: 3 July 1931
- Place of birth: Glasgow, Scotland
- Date of death: 2 September 2024 (aged 93)
- Position: Winger

Youth career
- 1948–1951: Luton Town

Senior career*
Years	Team	Apps	(Gls)
1951–1958	Luton Town	112	(16)
1958–1962	Grimsby Town	178	(35)
1962–1965	Derby County	24	(5)
- Wellington Town

International career
1956	Scotland B	1	(0)
1956	Scotland	1	(0)
- * Club domestic league appearances and goals

Michael Joseph Cullen (3 July 1931 – 2 September 2024) was a Scottish footballer who played as a winger, most noted as a player for Luton Town and Grimsby Town.

== Career ==
Cullen was born in Glasgow. At the age of 17, he signed for English Second Division side Luton Town in 1948. In 1956, he became the first Luton Town player ever to be capped by Scotland. He was sold to Grimsby Town in 1958, and after a successful spell there he moved on to Derby County. He moved on to Wellington Town, where he played out his career.

== Death ==
Cullen died on 2 September 2024, at the age of 93.
