= Michael J. Cullen =

American businessman

- Born: 1884; Newark, New Jersey, U.S.
- Died: April 24, 1936 (aged 51–52); Queens, New York, U.S.
- Occupations: Entrepreneur, businessperson, salesman, president, chief executive officer
- Spouse: Nan Cullen
- Children: 1
- Website: King Kullen

Michael J. Cullen (1884–1936) was an American entrepreneur and salesman known as the founder of the King Kullen grocery store chain, widely considered to be the first supermarket founded in America. He is recognized by the Smithsonian Institution as the inventor of the modern supermarket.

== History ==
Cullen was born in 1884 as the child of Irish immigrants. His surname derives from the Irish name O' Cuileannain or Ó Cuilinn. He joined The Great Atlantic & Pacific Tea Company in 1902 at the age of 18 and worked for the firm for 17 years. In 1919, Cullen joined Kroger Stores and worked for the company until 1930. While working as a Kroger regional manager in southern Illinois, he developed the idea of a supermarket. In 1930, at age 46, he wrote a letter to the president of Kroger, proposing a new type of food store with a focus on low prices, larger square footage, cash sales, no delivery service, and low-rent locations with plenty of parking. Cullen dramatically proclaimed: "I would lead the public out of the high-priced houses of bondage into the low prices of the house of the promised land."

Cullen's letter went unanswered. Undaunted, and confident in his ability to see his idea become a reality, he quit his job and moved his family to Long Island to launch his own store. Cullen leased a vacant garage at the corner of 171st Street and Jamaica Avenue in Queens, just a few blocks from a busy shopping district. On August 4, 1930, King Kullen Grocery Company opened the doors to the world's first supermarket. The store carried a range of approximately 1,000 items, including automotive accessories and hardware, as well as groceries. Success was rapid. People came from miles around. To many of his customers, Cullen offered convenient and affordable food. Bold newspaper ads described the store as the "World's Greatest Price Wrecker."

The chain expanded rapidly in the price-conscious environment of the Great Depression. King Kullen stores reused large older buildings, including abandoned factories and warehouses, in low-rent locations on the borders of populated areas. Facilities were simple. Service was minimal. Shopping carts were used and national brands were emphasized. The stores' no-frills bargain environment resonated with Depression-era customers. Ample, free parking was available in order to appeal to customers with automobiles and encourage them to purchase large quantities. By 1936 there were 17 King Kullen supermarkets with annual revenue of approximately $6,000,000. At the time, Cullen had plans for faster national expansion and franchising. However, in 1936, at age 52, Cullen died suddenly following an appendix operation. Following his death, the rate of growth of the firm slowed.

== Legacy ==
Although Cullen did not live long enough to see himself vindicated by history, he correctly foresaw that the supermarket would literally become the "World's Greatest Price Wrecker". One sign of the supermarket's success in slashing labor costs, overhead, and food prices was that the percentage of disposable income spent by American consumers on food plunged "from 21 percent in 1930 to 16 percent in 1940".

Existing grocery store retailers, including leading chains Safeway, Kroger and The Great Atlantic & Pacific Tea Company, found the supermarket concept easy to imitate. The number of supermarkets in the United States exploded from 94 in 1934 to 1,200 in 1936 to over 15,000 by 1950.

Meanwhile, King Kullen continued to grow and expand through the leadership of Cullen's wife and the support of family members. However, relative to competitors, its rate of growth has been slow. From 17 stores in 1936, the firm grew to 52 stores in 2009 (effectively 35 stores in 73 years). As of 2010, King Kullen was the 72nd largest supermarket chain in the United States, with 52 stores and US$940m in sales in 2009. It is currently owned and operated by the third generation of Cullen's descendants.

As of October 2016, the chain has 34 King Kullen locations, and also operates five "Wild by Nature" natural and organic markets.

== See also ==
- Piggly Wiggly, pioneered self service in 1916
