= William James Cullen, Lord Cullen =

Scottish judge

William James Cullen
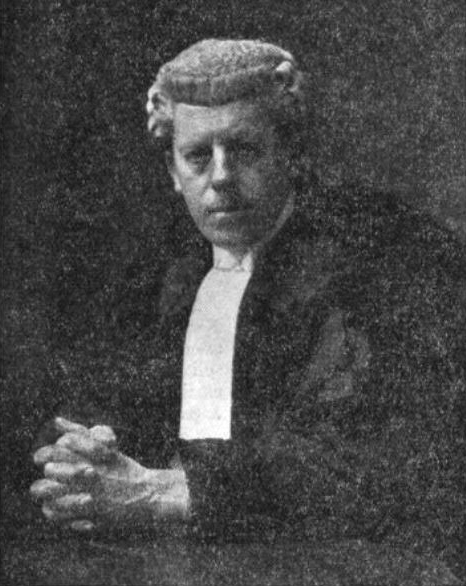
- Born: 9 September 1859
- Died: 19 June 1941 (aged 81); Edinburgh, Scotland
- Burial place: Dean Cemetery
- Education: University of Edinburgh
- Occupation: Judge
- Spouse: Grace Rutherfurd Clark (m. 1888)
- Children: 3

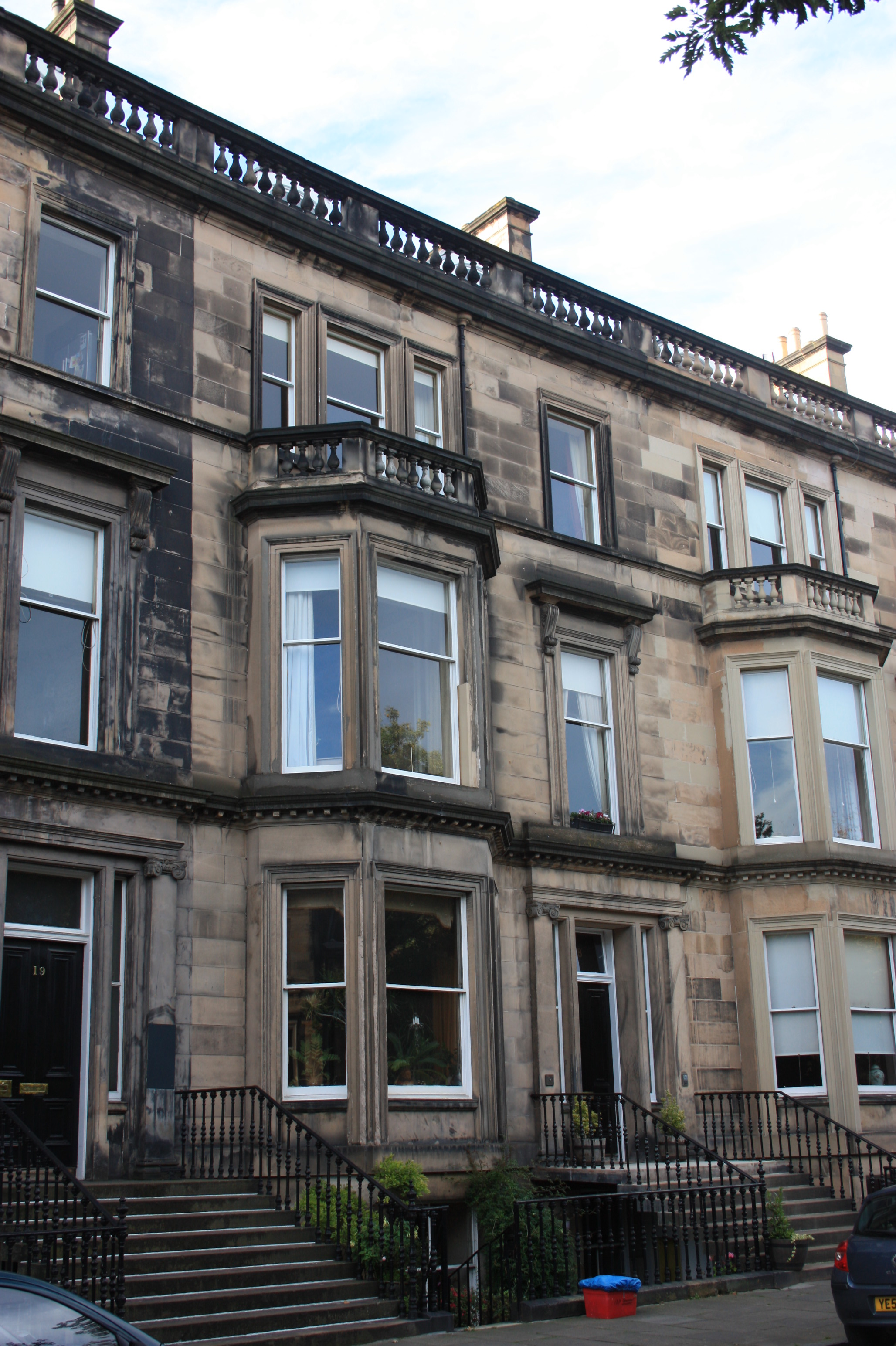
18 Grosvenor Crescent, Edinburgh

William James Cullen, Lord Cullen (9 September 1859 – 19 June 1941) was a Scottish judge who rose to be a Senator of the College of Justice. Cullen was born and raised in Edinburgh. He trained as a solicitor before becoming an advocate and specialising in the law of conveyancing, land and inheritance. He became a junior prosecutor, Sheriff of Fife and Kinross, and a Commissioner for Lunacy before being appointed to the bench as a Senator of the College of Justice. He was later promoted to the Inner House and sat in the Valuation Appeal Court until his resignation in 1925.

== Early life ==
Cullen was the son of Thomas Cullen, an inspector of stamps and taxes in Edinburgh. The family lived at 6 Waterloo Place at the east end of Princes Street.

He was educated at Edinburgh Collegiate School and at the University of Edinburgh, where he graduated with an MA in 1880 and an LLB in 1883.

== Career ==
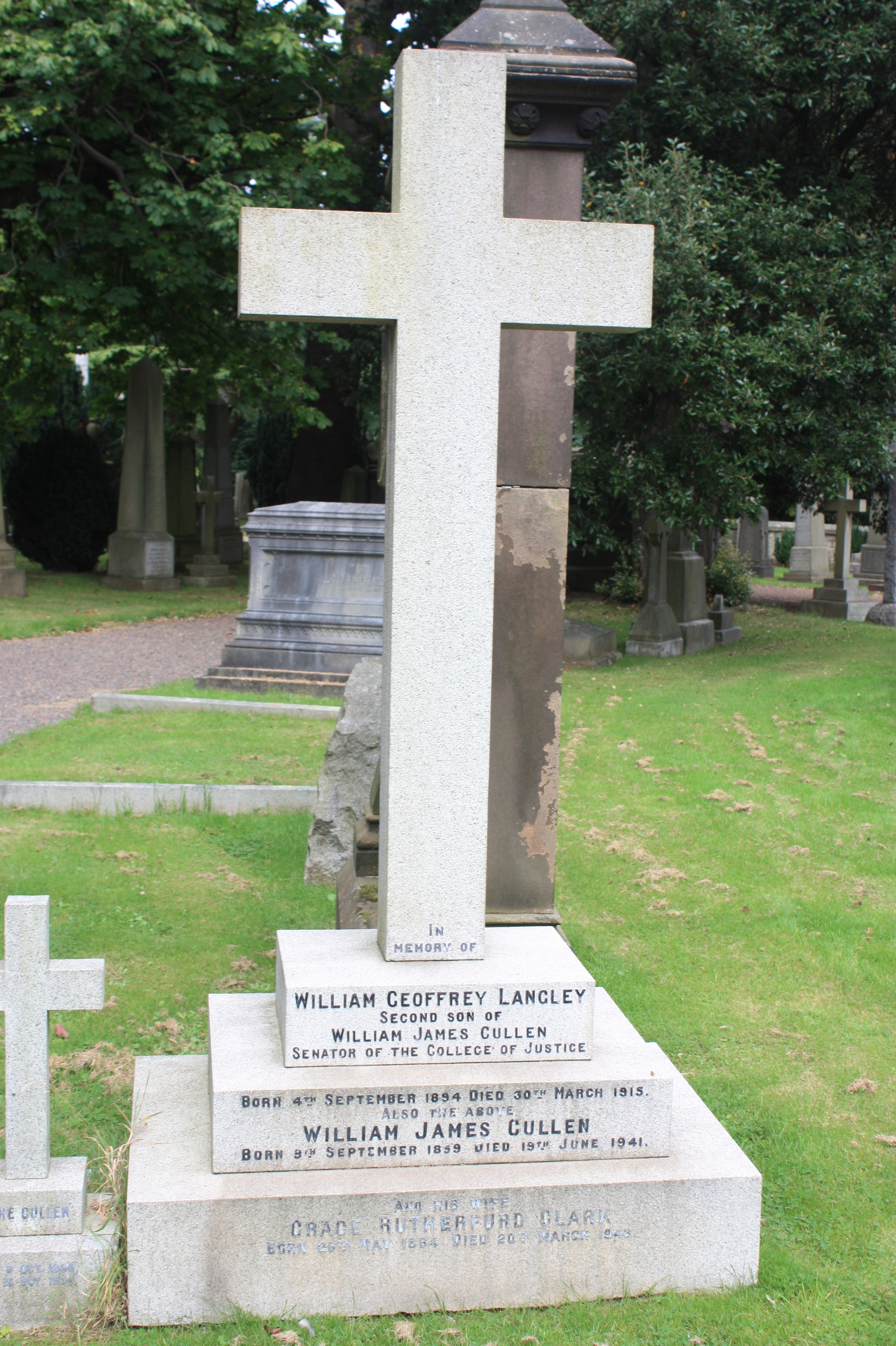
The grave of William James Cullen, Lord Cullen, Dean Cemetery, Edinburgh

In 1884, Cullen joined the company of J & F Adam as a writer to the signet, a specialist form of solicitor. He switched to the other branch of the legal profession, and was admitted as an advocate in 1891. He built his reputation specialising in the law of conveyancing, land and inheritance, and took silk in 1905.

From 1905 to 1906, Cullen worked as an advocate depute, a junior prosecutor. In July 1906, he was appointed as Sheriff of Fife and Kinross, replacing the deceased Robert Younger KC. In April 1907 he became an unpaid Commissioner For Lunacy, and in 1909 he was raised to the bench as a Senator of the College of Justice with the judicial title of Lord Cullen, filling the vacancy caused the resignation of Lord Pearson.

An unflamboyant judge who disliked public speaking and avoided ceremonies where possible, Cullen was promoted in 1918 to the Inner House, where he sat in the Valuation Appeal Court. He resigned from the court in 1925, and his seat was given to David Fleming KC, who became Lord Fleming.

== Personal life ==
In 1888, Cullen married Grace Rutherfurd Clark (1864-1943), from Manchester. They had one daughter, and two sons: Kenneth Douglas Cullen (born 1889), who became an advocate in 1919; and William Geoffrey Langley Cullen (1894-1915) who died whilst serving as a second lieutenant in the Royal Scots during the First World War.

He died at his home 18 Grosvenor Crescent in Edinburgh on 19 June 1941, aged 81.

He is buried in Dean Cemetery in western Edinburgh beneath a simple white cross in the south-west section (to the north of the huge Buchanan monument).
