= Mike Cullen (scientist) =

Australian ornithologist

- Born: John Micheal Cullen; December 13, 1927
- Died: March 23, 2001 (aged 73)
- Education: University of Oxford (DPhil)
- Scientific career
- Workplaces: University of Oxford; Monash University
- Thesis: A study of the behaviour of the Arctic tern (Sterna macrura) (1956)
- Doctoral students: John Krebs

John Michael Cullen (14 December 1927 – 23 March 2001) was an Australian ornithologist, of English origin.

== Education ==
Cullen began his academic career by studying mathematics at the University of Oxford where he was a student at Wadham College, Oxford, but later switched to zoology, spending time at the Edward Grey Institute of Field Ornithology while investigating the ecology of marsh tits. He subsequently was awarded a PhD for work with Niko Tinbergen studying the behaviour of arctic terns on the Farne Islands off the coast of Northumberland.

== Career and research ==
In 1976 he moved to Australia, to Monash University in Melbourne, Victoria, Australia. There he was involved in an investigation of Abbott's booby on Christmas Island which was threatened by phosphate mining. He served on the Field Investigation Committee of the Royal Australasian Ornithologists Union (RAOU) for which he organised the Rolling Bird Survey project. However, he is best known for long-term studies of the little penguin at Phillip Island and in Port Phillip Bay at St Kilda, Victoria, in collaboration with Pauline Reilly and others.

His former doctoral students include John Krebs and he mentored Richard Dawkins.
