= Swartwout =

Swartwout is a Dutch surname, a variant of Swarthout (literally, black skin). Notable people with it include:

- Cornelius Swartwout (1839–1910), American inventor
- Egerton Swartwout (1870–1943), American architect
  - Tracy and Swartwout, an architectural firm in New York City
- Frederick Swartwout Cozzens (1818–1869), American humorist
- Jacobus Swartwout (1734–1827), American landowner, statesman and military leader
- Robert Swartwout (1779–1848), American military officer, merchant and alderman
- Robert Egerton Swartwout (1905–1951), American-born author, poet and cartoonist
- Roeloff Swartwout (1634–1715), Dutch settler in America
- Samuel Swartwout (1783–1856), American soldier, merchant and politician
  - Swartwout–Hoyt scandal, a political scandal in 1829
- Thomas Samuel Swartwout (1660–1723), American settler
- Tomys Swartwout (1607–1660), Dutch merchant, ancestor of Robert Swartwout
