= List of hotels in New York City =

The following is a list of some notable hotels in New York City.

== Number of hotels ==
Most of the hotels are represented by the Hotel Association of New York City trade organization. As of 2016, the organization had 270 members, representing 75,000 rooms and 50,000 employees. Private hotels, such as the Yale Club, are members of the group.

More than half the hotels (114) are in Midtown Manhattan with 75 on the west side (most in the Times Square area) and 39 on the Midtown East Side. The city tourist list does not include single room occupancy hotels.

== Largest hotels ==
Following is a list of the largest hotels in New York based on number of rentable rooms. Included in this lists is any hotel in the NYC area with at least 600 rooms.

The total room number includes suites. Some large hotels have been carved up into mixed use buildings in which the hotel occupies a portion of the building. This list includes only the hotel portion.

Hotel	Total Rooms
New York Marriott Marquis	1,966
New York Hilton Midtown	1,929
Sheraton New York Times Square Hotel	1,780
Hyatt Grand Central New York	1,298
Row NYC	1,331
New Yorker Hotel	1,083
Park Central Hotel	935
The New York Palace Hotel	909
Edison Hotel	900
The Westin New York at Times Square	873
Crowne Plaza Times Square	795
The Westin New York Grand Central Hotel	774
Millennium Broadway Hotel	750
The Lexington Hotel NYC	725
YOTEL New York at Times Square	713
Wellington Hotel	700
InterContinental New York Barclay Hotel	686
The Manhattan at Times Square	685
New York Marriott at the Brooklyn Bridge	665
Moxy NYC Times Square	612
InterContinental New York Times Square	607

== Hotels on the National Register of Historic Places ==
Hotel	Address	Notes
Ansonia Hotel	2101–2119 Broadway	
Barbizon Hotel for Women	140 East 63rd Street	
The Chatwal New York	130 West 44th Street	Listed on the NRHP as the Lamb's Club; the building was converted into a hotel later.
Gilsey Hotel	1200 Broadway	
Grand Hotel	1232–1238 Broadway	
Hotel Beacon	2124 Broadway	Listed along with the Beacon Theatre.
Hotel Chelsea	222 West 23rd Street	
Hotel Gerard	123 West 44th Street	
Hotel Theresa	2082–2096 Adam Clayton Powell, Jr. Boulevard.	
The Knickerbocker Hotel	142 West 42nd Street	
Plaza Hotel	768 Fifth Avenue	
Prince George Hotel	505 Eighth Avenue	
Seville Hotel	22 East 29th Street	
Times Square Hotel	255 West 43rd Street	
Webster Hotel	40 West 45th Street	

== Hotels in the Historic Hotels of America ==
Hotel	Address	Notes
Essex House	160 Central Park South	
Martinique New York	49 West 32nd Street	
Omni Berkshire Place	21 East 52nd Street	
Plaza Hotel	768 Fifth Avenue	
The Redbury New York	29 East 29th Street	

== Future casino hotels ==
In late 2025, three casino licenses for Downstate New York were awarded. New casino hotels, often referred to as integrated resorts will be built in New York City.

In Queens, two proposals for large casino hotels were approved. Hard Rock International will build a 2,300 room integrated resort next to Citi Field at Flushing Meadow-Corona Park. Hard Rock Hotel & Casino Metropolitan Park will become the largest hotel in New York City. In South Ozone Park, Genting Group will expand Resorts World New York City into a 2,000 room integrated resort, which will also be among the largest hotel in the city. In the Bronx, Bally's Corporation will build a casino hotel that features 500 rooms. The hotel will be located at the golf course they operate at Ferry Point Park in Throggs Neck.

== Former hotels ==
- Grand Central Hotel
- Hotel Pennsylvania
- Hotel Vanderbilt
- New York Biltmore Hotel
- Stanhope Hotel
- Marriott World Trade Center
