= Herman T. Schladermundt =

Main Reading Room. Detail of stained glass window inside alcove. Library of Congress Thomas Jefferson Building, Washington, D.C. LCCN2011646835

Herman T. Schladermundt (1863–1937) was an American artist known for murals and stained glass.

== Biography ==
Schladermundt was born in Milwaukee, Wisconsin to Joachim Schladermundt and Caroline Widman in 1863. He studied art at the Academie Delecluse and Academie Julian in Paris.

His well known mural works include the apse decoration at Central Congregational Church in Providence, Rhode Island, canvas lobby murals at the Byron White United States Courthouse in Denver, Colorado, Villa Carola, the private home of Isaac Guggenheim in Port Washington, New York, and in the Grand Jury Room at the New Jersey Court House in Newark, New Jersey.

Well known stained glass work includes the windows in the sanctuary of Memorial Presbyterian Church in St. Augustine, Florida, the Main Reading Room of the Library of Congress in Washington, DC, the Missouri State Capitol in Jefferson City, Missouri, the administration building at Iona College, Elizabeth Seton Campus in Yonkers, New York (formerly the Boyce Thompson mansion), and the great frieze of the Colonial Theater in Boston, Massachusetts.

Schladermundt died on January 26, 1937, in Kent, Connecticut. He was married to Anna Gardner from 1897 until his death and they had two children, Peter and Rosaline. Schladermundt was a long time member the Century Association, the Architectural League of New York, and the National Society of Mural Painters, serving as their secretary. He won the Allied Arts Prize from the Architectural League of New York in 1898, as well as an award for his exhibited work at the 1893 Chicago Exposition in 1893.

Some of Schladermundt's works are held at the Art Institute of Chicago
