= Memorial Presbyterian Church =

Historic Church in St Augustine Florida

Coordinates: 29.89379°N 81.31688°W

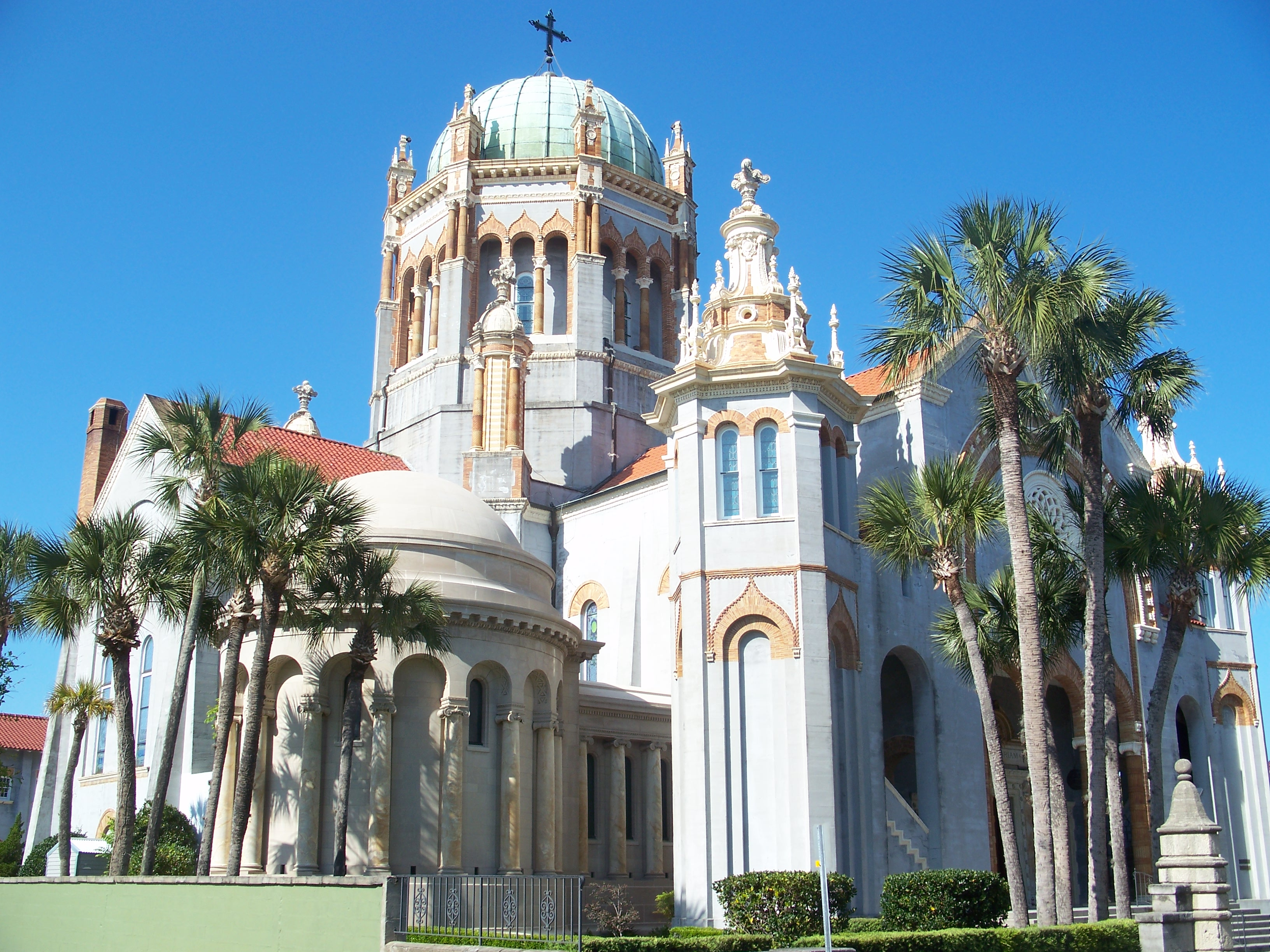
Memorial Presbyterian Church

The Memorial Presbyterian Church is a historic church constructed in St. Augustine, Florida, in 1889 by American industrialist Henry Morrison Flagler. It is located at 32 Sevilla Street. It was dedicated to the memory of his daughter Jennie Louise Benedict, who died following complications from childbirth at sea in March 1889.

== History ==
Flagler was a life-long member of the Presbyterian Church, and upon his daughter's death chose a plot of land on the corner of Sevilla and Valencia Streets, which was very near his hotels, to construct a new church building for the Presbyterian congregation in St. Augustine, the first in Florida. The building, the land it sits on, and the parsonage at the time were all donated to the Presbyterian Church and exchanged for land they owned on St. George and Hypolita Streets (Flagler would later build a municipal building for the city on this site).

Like Flagler's other St. Augustine buildings (the Hotel Ponce de Leon, the Hotel Alcazar, and Grace United Methodist Church), Memorial Presbyterian was designed by John M. Carrere and Thomas Hastings of Carrere and Hastings architecture firm in New York; however, it greatly differs in architectural style. St. Mark's Basilica inspired the Venetian Renaissance style and Latin cross-shaped sanctuary in Venice. It contains design elements of Spanish, Moorish, Italian, and Baroque style. The building was constructed by builders McGuire and McDonald using poured concrete mixed with coquina, a process also used in Flagler's other buildings as well as in Franklin W. Smith's nearby Villa Zorayda and Casa Monica Hotel.

The cost of the construction was around $250,000. Many of the exterior architectural details were created with gold and white terracotta. The copper dome was created in Italy, the floors are Italian marble, the pews are carved from mahogany, and the baptismal font was carved from a single block of Siena marble. The baptismal font's inscription reads, "'In Memoriam—F. H. B. to J. L, B.—March 25th, 1889. I will be a God unto thee and to thy seed after thee. (Genesis 17:7)". The church was dedicated on March 16, 1890, and the ceremony was attended by many dignitaries, including First Lady Caroline Harrison, and Vice President Levi Morton. Stained glass windows designed by German artist Herman T. Schladermundt took twelve years to complete and were finally installed in 1901. When Flagler died in 1913, he was interred in a marble mausoleum connected to the church alongside his daughter Jennie, his infant granddaughter Margery, and first wife Mary Harkness Flagler.

In 2012, CNN included Memorial Presbyterian in a list of one of the top eight religious wonders to visit in the United States.

Following Hurricane Irma in 2017, Memorial Presbyterian's copper dome underwent a major restoration costing $3.5 million. The 900 pound cross that sat at the top of the dome fell and pierced several holes through the copper. The cross was removed while the dome was repaired, but was later returned. As of March 2019, the church is continuing renovation work to repair damage from Hurricane Matthew and Hurricane Irma.

The current Pastor and Head of Staff is Flagler College graduate Rev. Dr. W. Hunter Camp, II. Free self-guided building tours are available to the public Tuesday thru Friday & Sunday 12:30pm-3:30pm. Closed Monday & Saturday.

== Gallery ==
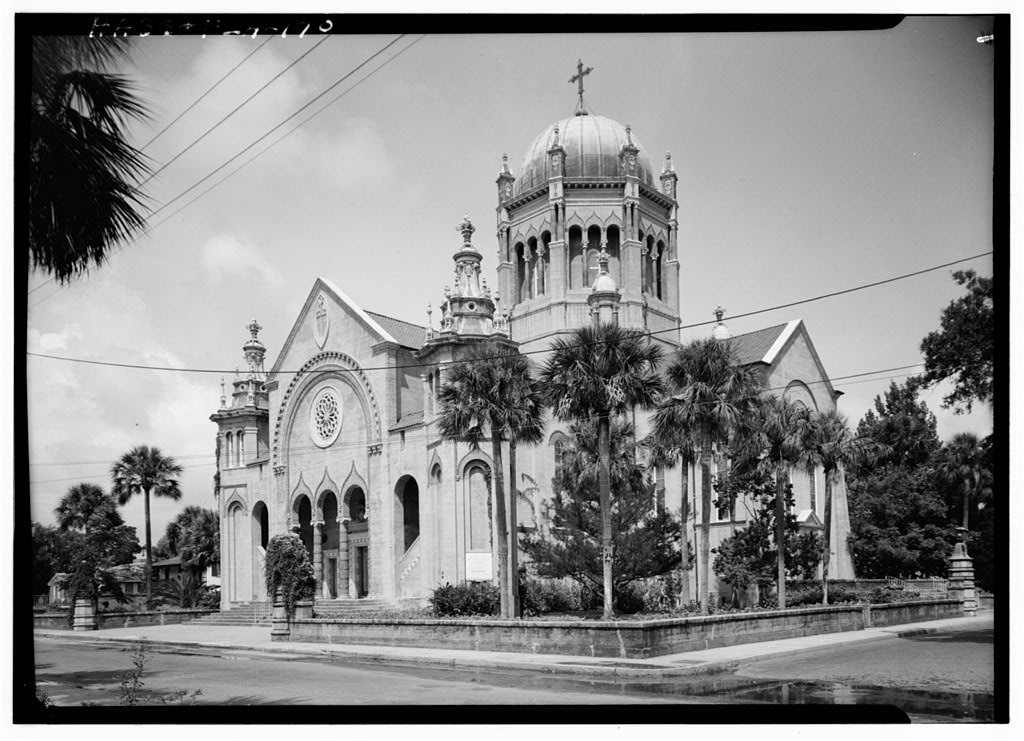
Memorial Presbyterian Church from the Historic American Buildings Survey

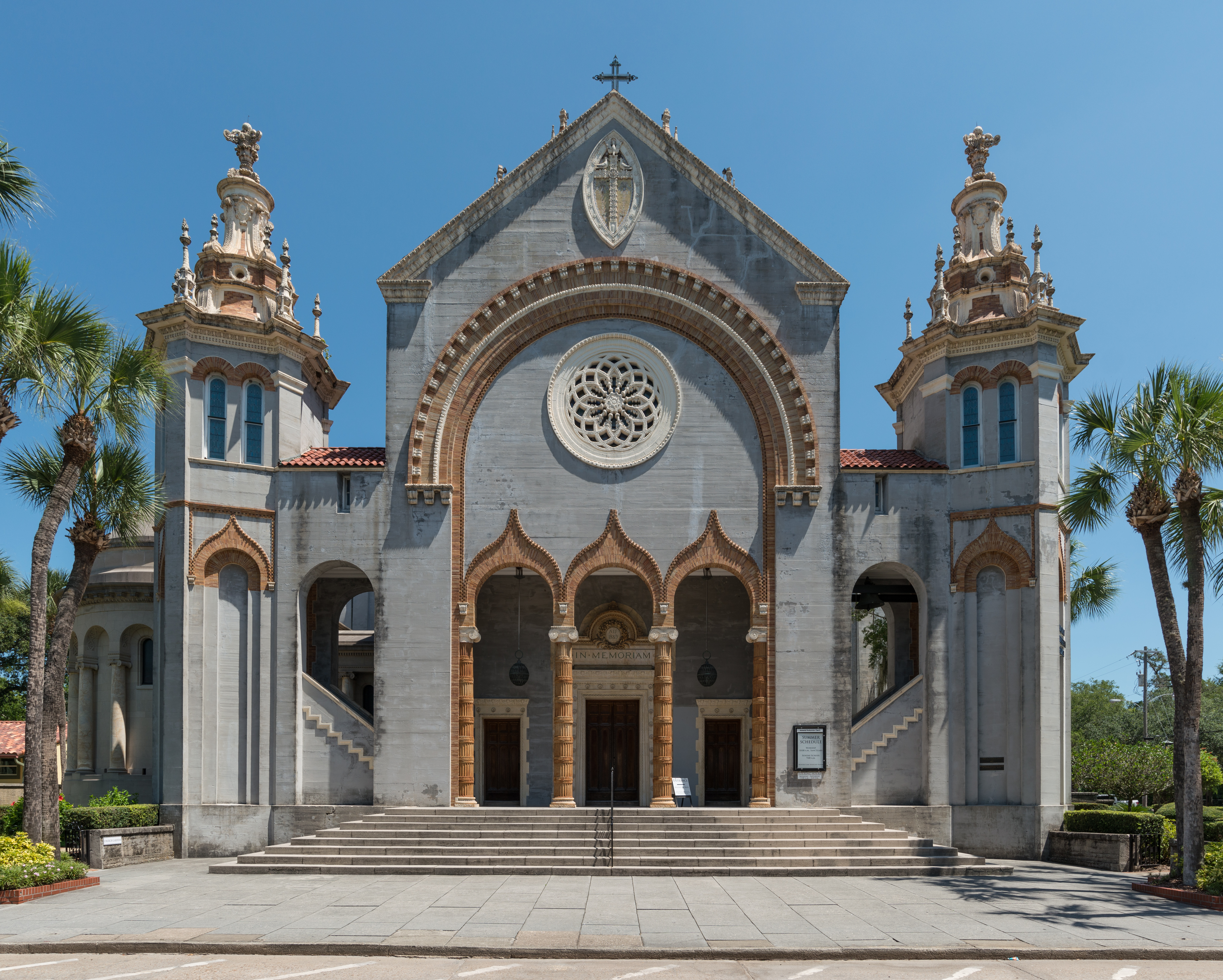
South facade

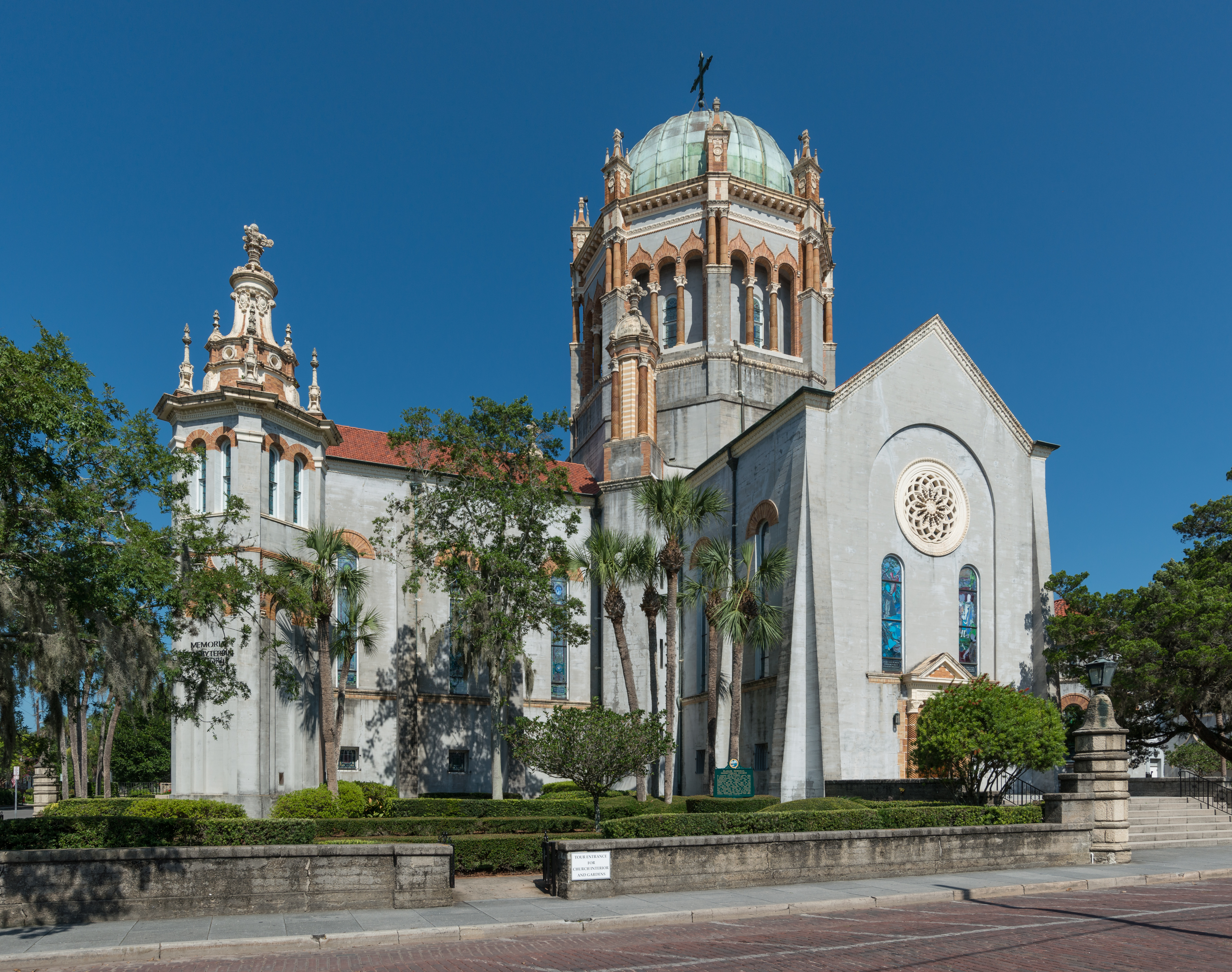
Southeast view

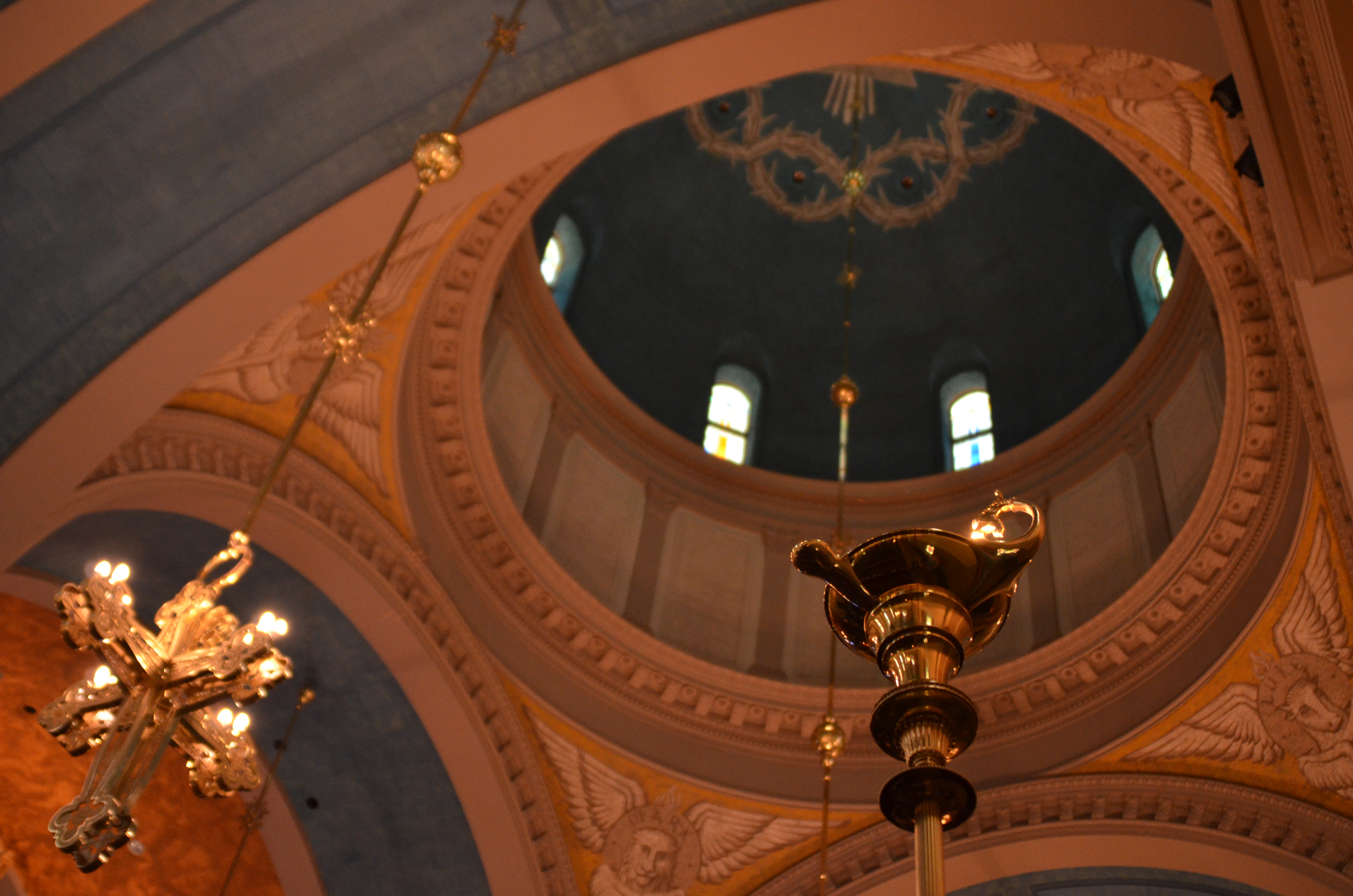
Interior view

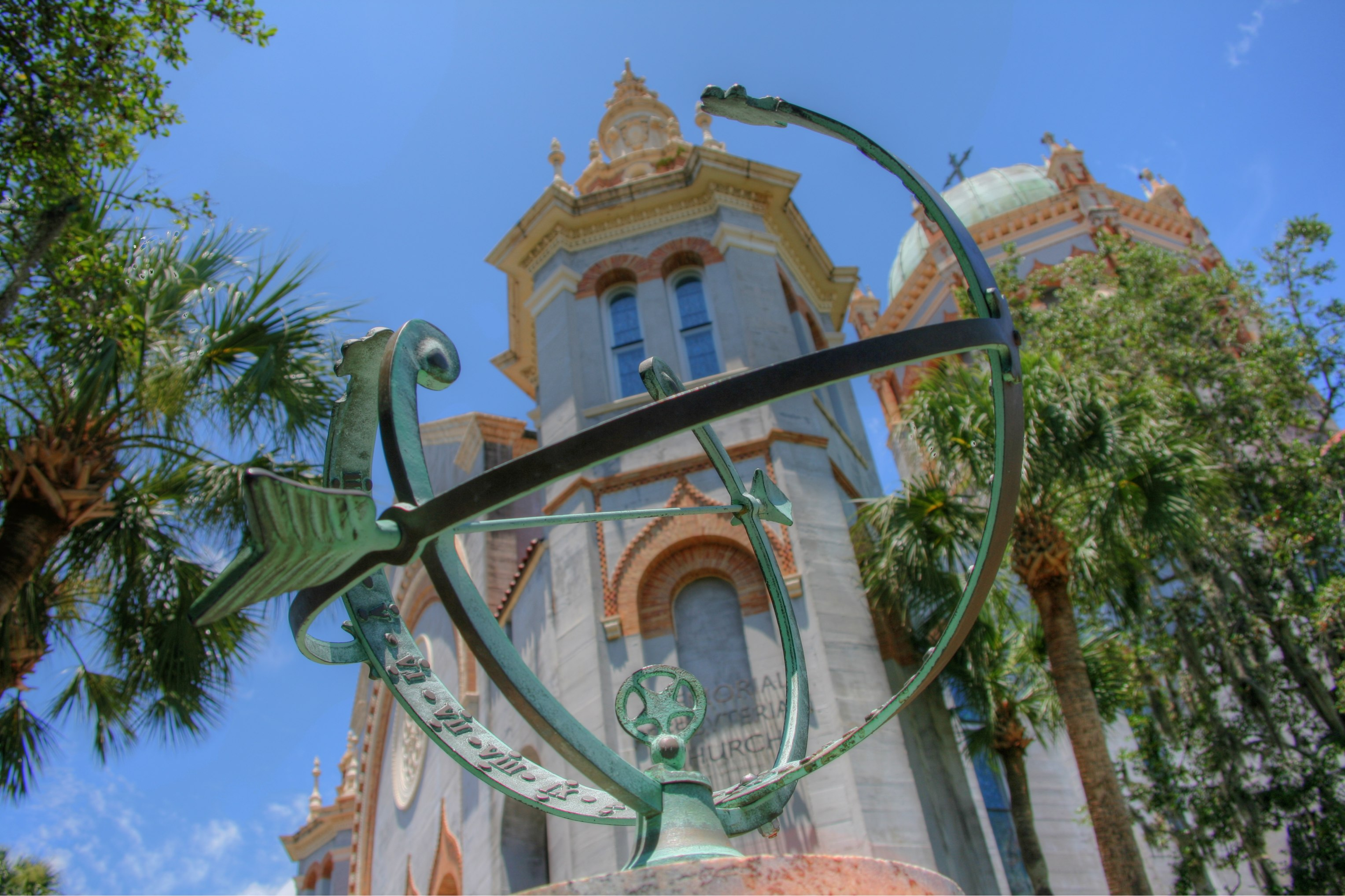
Sundial

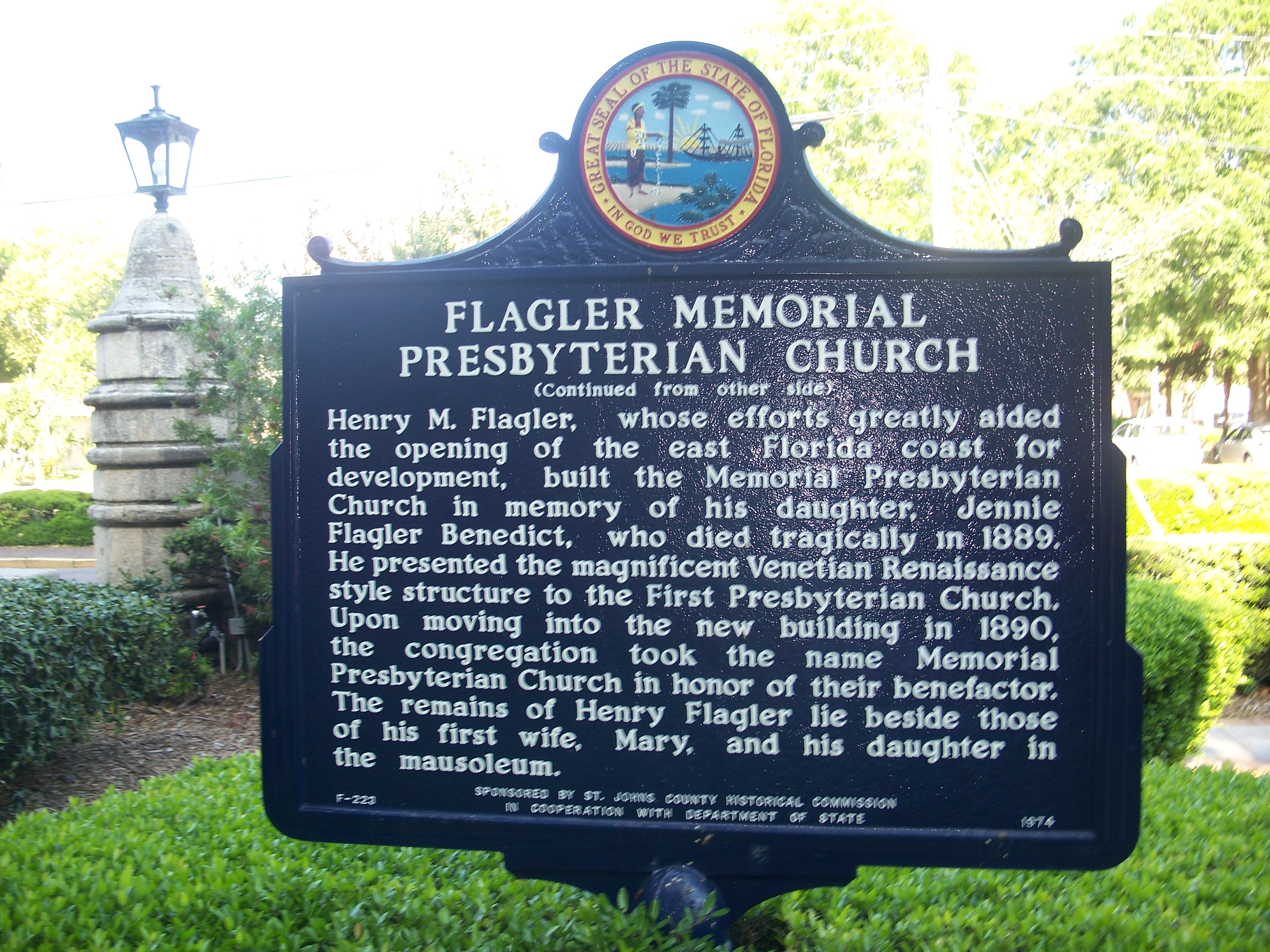
Historical Plaque

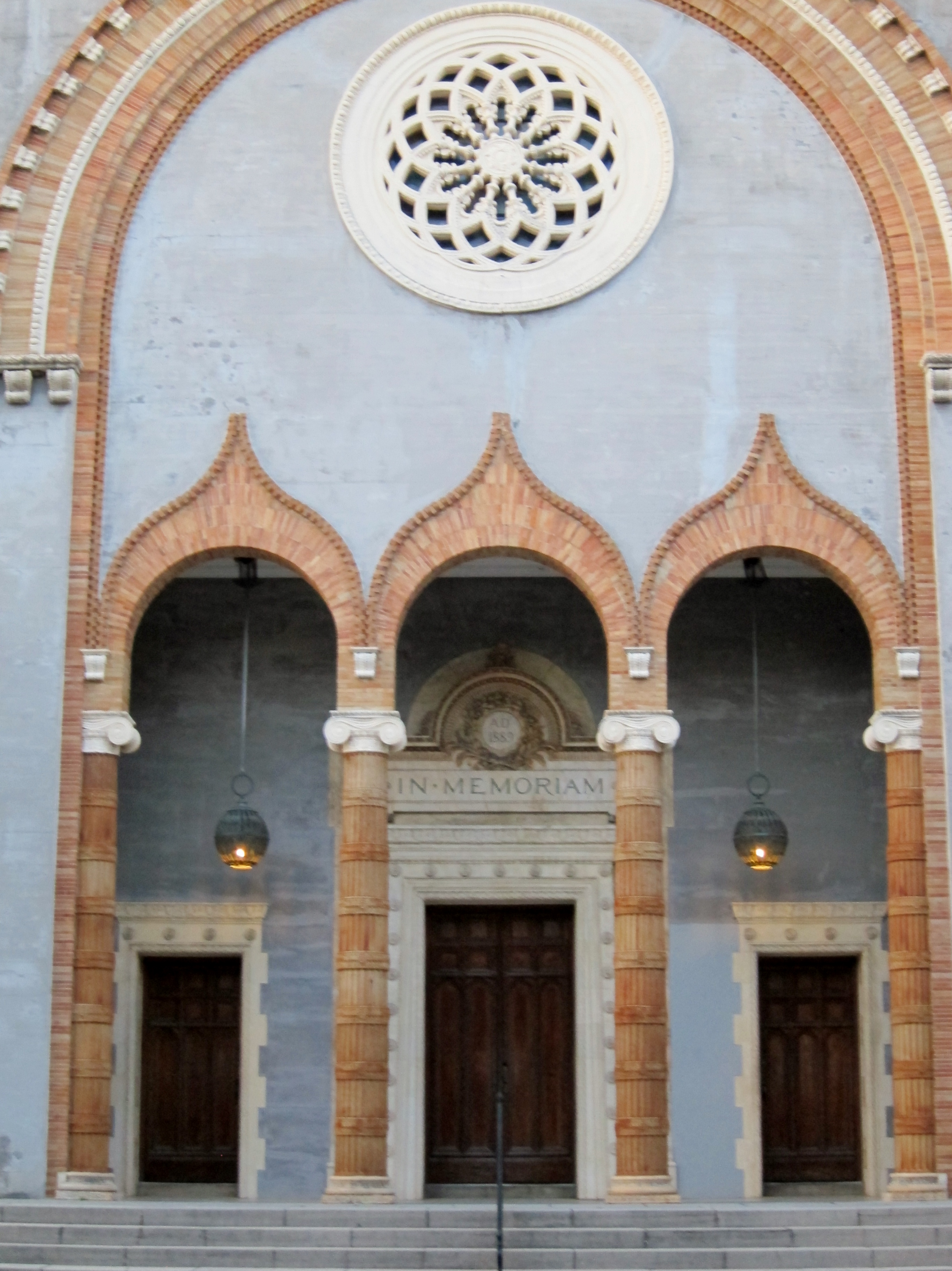
South facade detail

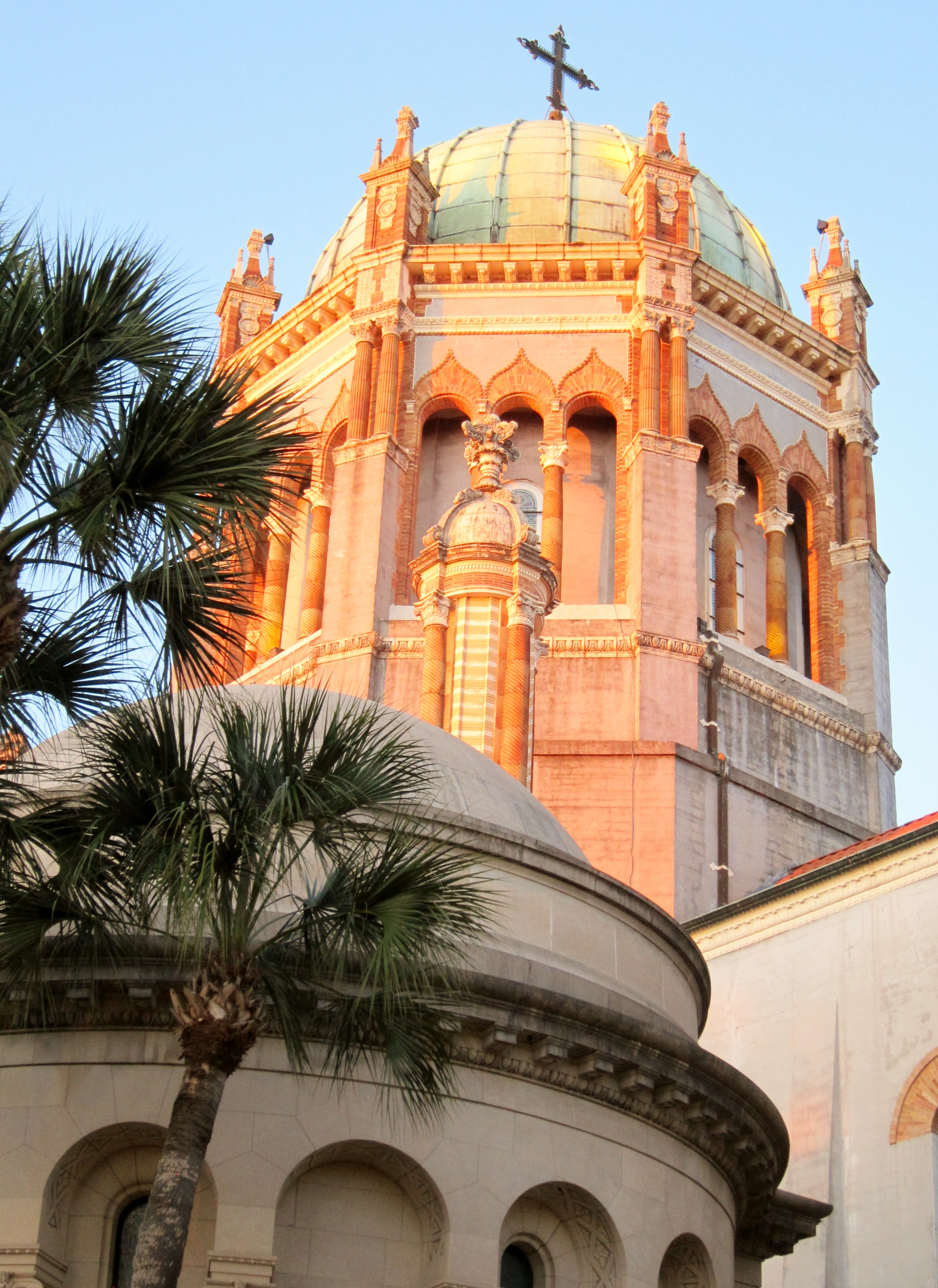
Dome detail
