= Jesse Hoyt =

American politician

Collector of the Port of New York
- In office 1838–1841
- Appointed by: Martin Van Buren
- Preceded by: Samuel Swartwout
- Succeeded by: John J. Morgan

Member of the New York State Assembly from New York County
- In office January 1, 1823 – December 31, 1823

Personal details
- Born: June 28, 1792 New Canaan, Connecticut, U.S.
- Died: March 17, 1867 (aged 74) New York City, New York, U.S.
- Party: Democratic-Republican
- Spouse: Cornelia Emeline Thurston (m. 1828; died 1852)
- Children: 6
- Parent(s): Goold Hoyt; Sarah Reid
- Known for: Swartwout-Hoyt scandal

Jesse Hoyt (June 28, 1792 – March 17, 1867) was an American lawyer and politician from New York.

== Early life ==
Hoyt was born in New Canaan, Fairfield County, Connecticut on June 28, 1792. He was the second son and third born of nine total children of Goold Hoyt, (Note: Sometimes spelled Goold and other times Gould) a merchant and broker, and Sarah (née Reid) Hoyt.

His paternal grandparents were Justus Hoyt, a shoemaker and farmer who served one campaign in the French and Indian War, and Elizabeth Hoyt and his maternal grandfather was Timothy Reed.

== Career ==
He moved to Albany, New York, and became a merchant but failed. Then, he studied law with Martin Van Buren, was admitted to the bar in 1819, and commenced practice in partnership with Van Buren and Benjamin F. Butler in Hudson, New York. Soon after, Hoyt removed to New York City, and continued the practice of law there, specializing in Chancery cases.

He was a member from New York County of the New York State Assembly in 1823. Hoyt was part of the Bucktails faction of the Democratic-Republican Party. (Note: The Anti-Federalists called themselves "Republicans." However, at the same time, the Federalists called them "Democrats" which was meant to be pejorative. After some time both terms got more and more confused, and sometimes used together as "Democratic Republicans" which later historians have adopted (with a hyphen) to describe the party from the beginning, to avoid confusion with both the later established and still existing Democratic and Republican parties.)

In 1838, Hoyt was appointed by President Van Buren as Collector of the Port of New York to replace Samuel Swartwout who had been Collector since 1829. Soon after Hoyt's taking office, Swartwout was accused of embezzlement, but in February 1841, Van Buren was forced to remove Hoyt by appointing John J. Morgan as Collector, after Hoyt had also been accused of embezzlement. The episode became known as the Swartwout-Hoyt scandal. Afterwards, Hoyt resumed the practice of law.

== Personal life ==
On April 3, 1828, he married Cornelia Emeline Thurston (1803–1852). She was the daughter of Robert Jenkins Thurston and Abigail (née Bogert) Thurston. Together, they were the parents of six children:

- Cornelia Thurston Hoyt (1829–1888).
- Louis Thurston Hoyt (1834–1901), who married Marie Antoinette Bogert (1839–1879). After her death, he married Frances Mary Jones (1839–1930).
- William Henry Hoyt.
- Emily Adele Hoyt (1838–1889), who married Francis Adams De Wint (1834–1866).
- Robert Sands Hoyt (1840–1879).
- Ella Carroll Hoyt, who married J. de Wint Whittemore.

Hoyt died in New York City on March 17, 1867.

Government offices
Preceded by Samuel Swartwout	Collector of the Port of New York; 1838–1841	Succeeded by John J. Morgan
