= Sylacauga marble =

Type of marble

Giuseppe Moretti's Head of Christ, carved from Sylacauga marble.

Sylacauga marble, also commonly known as Alabama marble, is a marble that is found in a belt running through Talladega County, Alabama. It is prized for its pure white color and its crystalline structure. The stone is named after the town of Sylacauga, Alabama, which is sometimes called "the Marble City". Sylacauga marble has been called the "world's whitest". Discovered in 1814, it has been mined for over 160 years, and is used for building, sculpture, and industry. The Alabama Legislature passed Act 755 on September 12, 1969, which made this marble the state's official rock.

== Occurrence ==
Sylacauga marble occurs mainly in Alabama's Talladega County. It runs in a swath 32 miles (51 km) in length, from the Coosa River to just south of the city of Talladega. The deposit is up to 600 feet (180 m) in depth and is focused on the city of Sylacauga, for which it is named.

== Mining ==
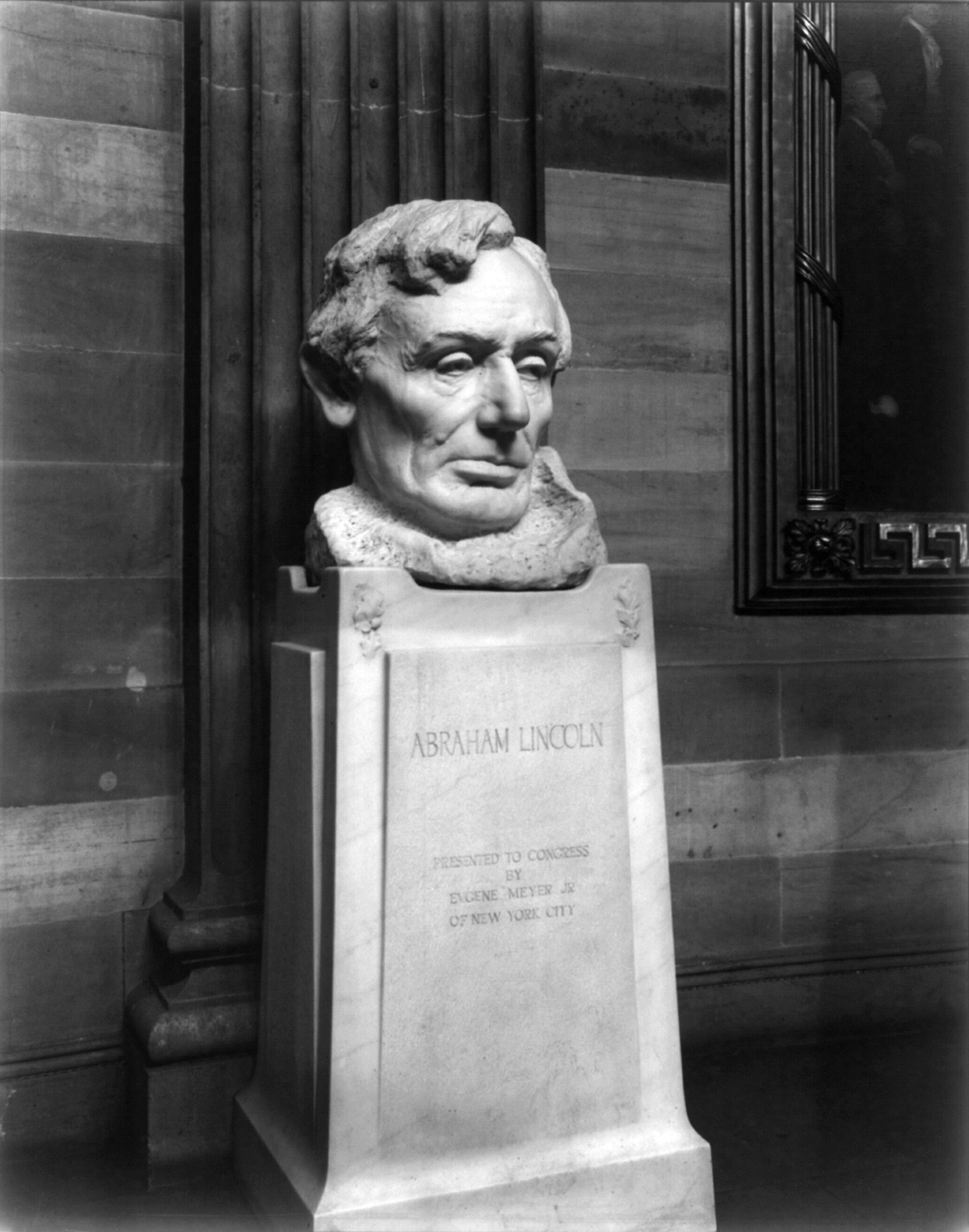
Bust of Abraham Lincoln by Gutzon Borglum in the United States Capitol rotunda in Washington, D.C.

The first quarry that was developed to mine the marble was that of physician Edward Gantt, established in 1834. The George Herd Family consolidated several smaller quarries shortly thereafter and sold the first quarried marble from the area in 1838 for use as funerary monuments. These and various other quarry operations expanded during the last decades of the nineteenth century. Italian sculptor Giuseppe Moretti discovered the marble while in Alabama during 1903. He was working on the massive Vulcan statue for the Louisiana Purchase Exposition, commissioned by the Commercial Club of Birmingham. He established the Moretti-Harrah Marble Company, which exposed other areas of the country to Sylacauga marble.

Major mining operations today include Omya, Sylacauga Marble Mining, and Canadian Polycor Company. Although the pure white color is most widely known in the market, portions of the deposit produce types with bodies or veining in black, pink, gray, and yellow hues.

== Uses ==
Sylacauga marble is fine-grained and nearly pure calcite, making it extremely similar to white Carrara marble. Sylacauga marble was used for Gutzon Borglum's bust of Abraham Lincoln in the United States Capitol rotunda. He commented that the stone's fine texture let him portray the expression of kindness on Lincoln's face, something he had never been able to do with other stones.

It has been used extensively for architectural projects. Some examples of interior architectural use of Sylacauga marble include the translucent ceiling of the Lincoln Memorial in Washington D.C., the United States Supreme Court Building (most of the interior, except courtroom) in Washington D.C., the National Metropolitan Bank Building in Washington D.C., the Army and Navy Club Building in Washington D.C., the rotunda of the Alexander Hamilton U.S. Custom House in Manhattan, the Mercedes-Benz showroom in Manhattan, the Old Chicago Main Post Office in Chicago, the Kesner Building in Chicago, the University Club in Chicago, the Select Council Chamber of City Hall in Philadelphia, the Brown Marx Building in Birmingham, Alabama, the Florence Hotel in Birmingham, and the Alabama Department of Archives and History in Montgomery, Alabama. Use of the marble as an exterior building material includes the Dime Savings Bank of New York in Brooklyn, the former Connecticut Savings Bank (now Wells Fargo) in New Haven, Connecticut, the Somerset County Courthouse in Somerville, New Jersey, the main building of the Maryland Institute College of Art in Baltimore, J. Ogden Armour's Mellody Farm in Lake Forest, Illinois, the Atlantic National Bank Building in Jacksonville, Florida, the old United States Post Office in Mobile, Alabama (demolished), the Church of Jesus Christ of Latter-day Saints' Temple in Washington D.C., and the Chrysler Mausoleum in Sleepy Hollow, New York.

Aside from use as sculptural media and as a building stone, Sylacauga marble is also used in industry as a paint pigment, for pharmaceuticals, as a coating to whiten high-quality paper, and other purposes. It is also used in agriculture as a soil amendment.

Structures utilizing Sylacauga marble
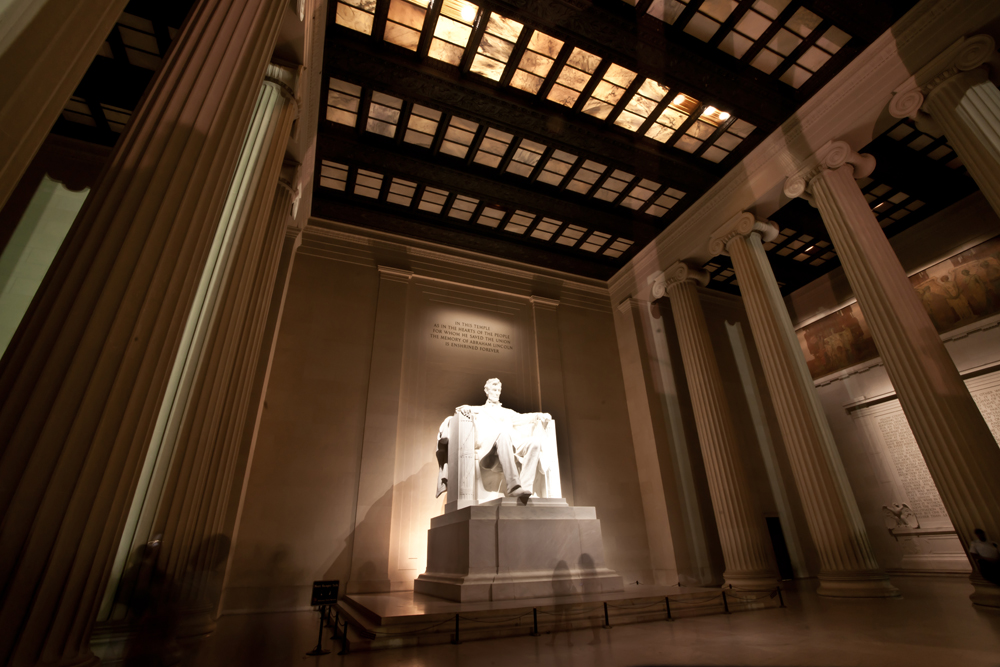
The translucent Sylacauga marble ceiling of the Lincoln Memorial in Washington, D.C.

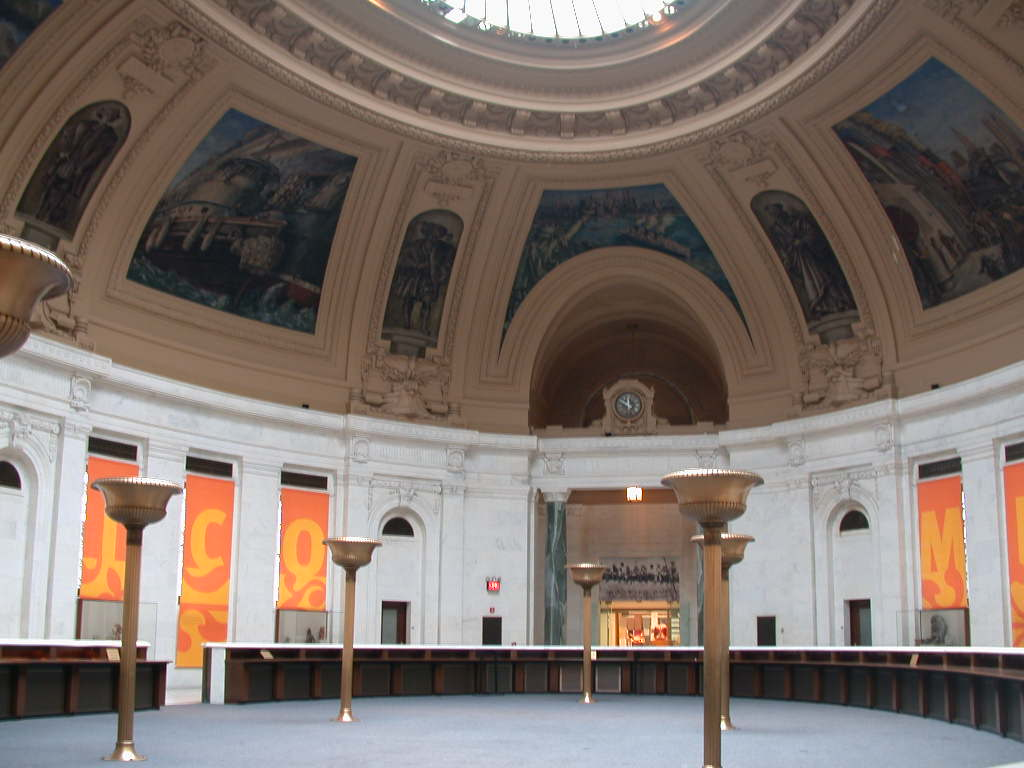
The rotunda of the Alexander Hamilton U.S. Custom House in Manhattan.

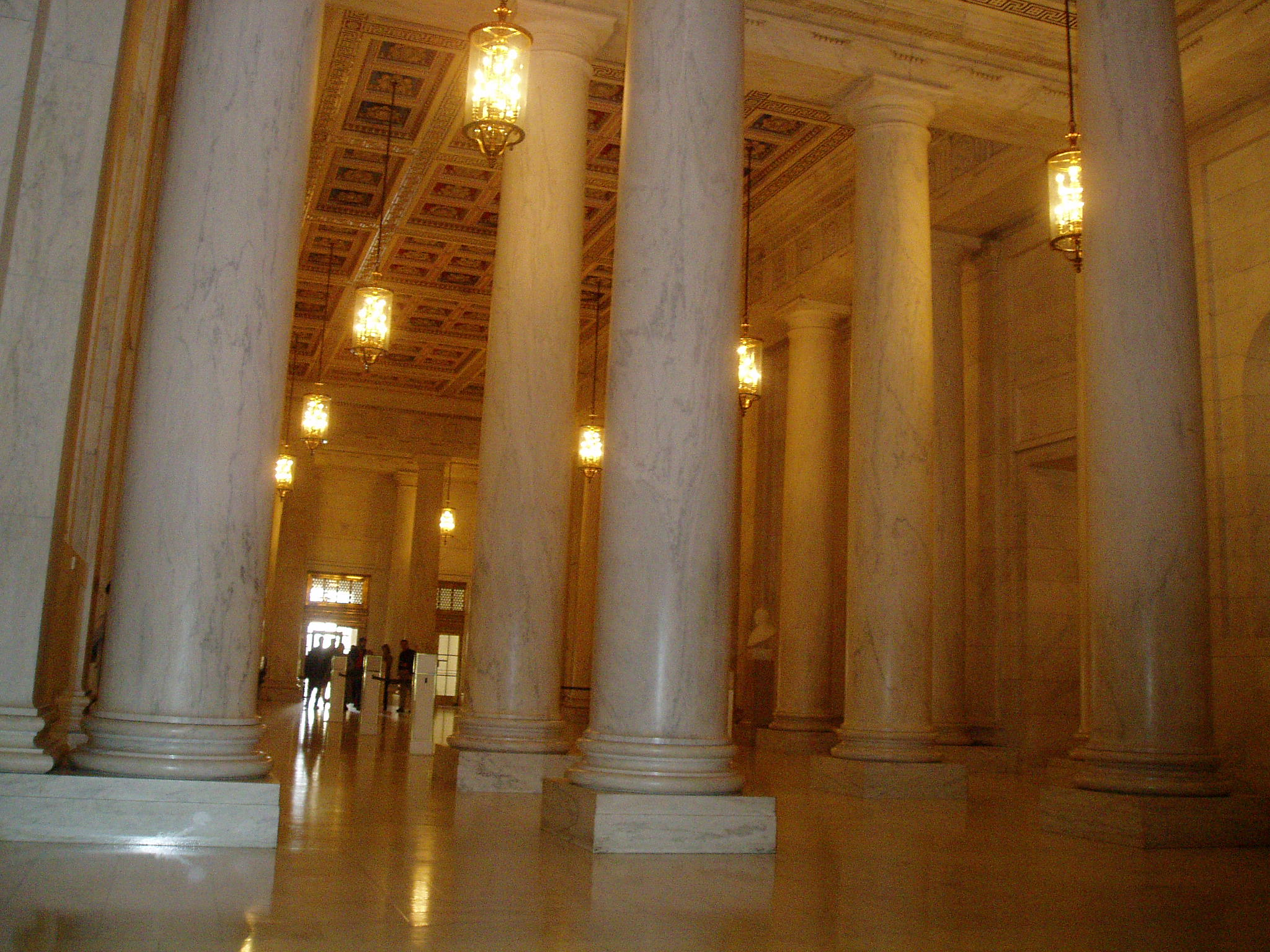
The interiors (except for the actual courtroom) of the United States Supreme Court Building.

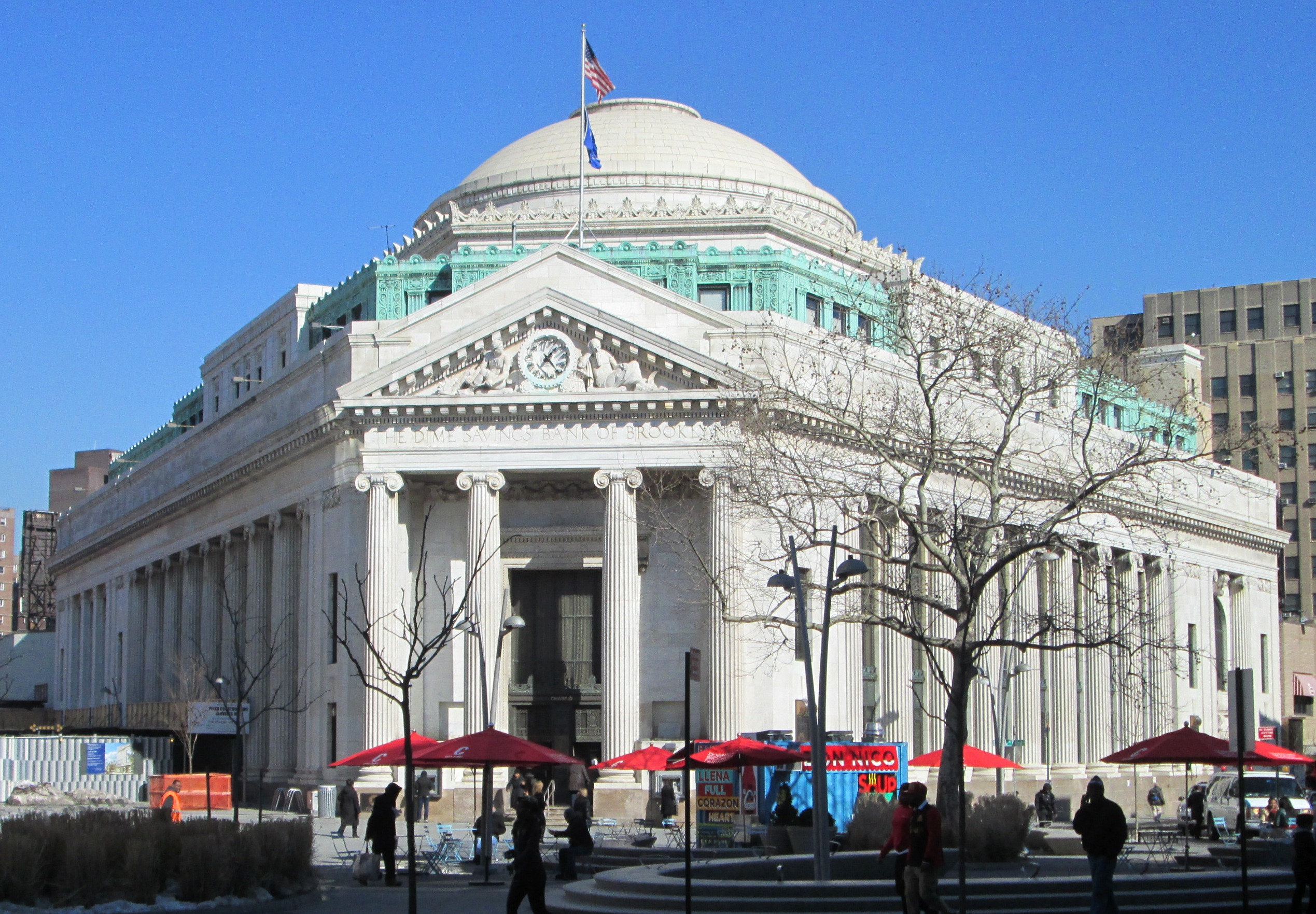
The exterior of the Dime Savings Bank of New York building at 9 DeKalb Avenue in Brooklyn.

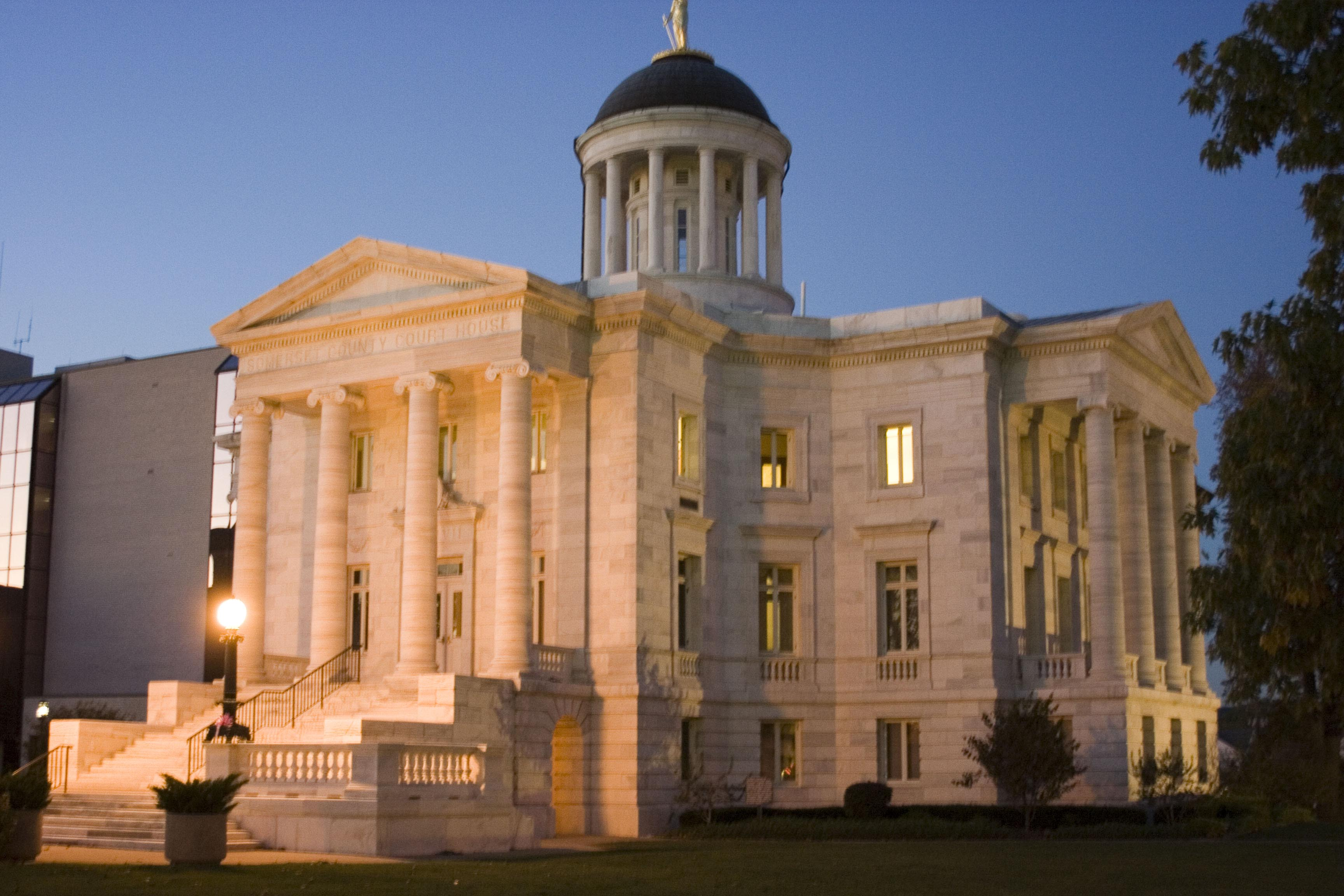
The exterior of the Somerset County Courthouse in Somerville, New Jersey.

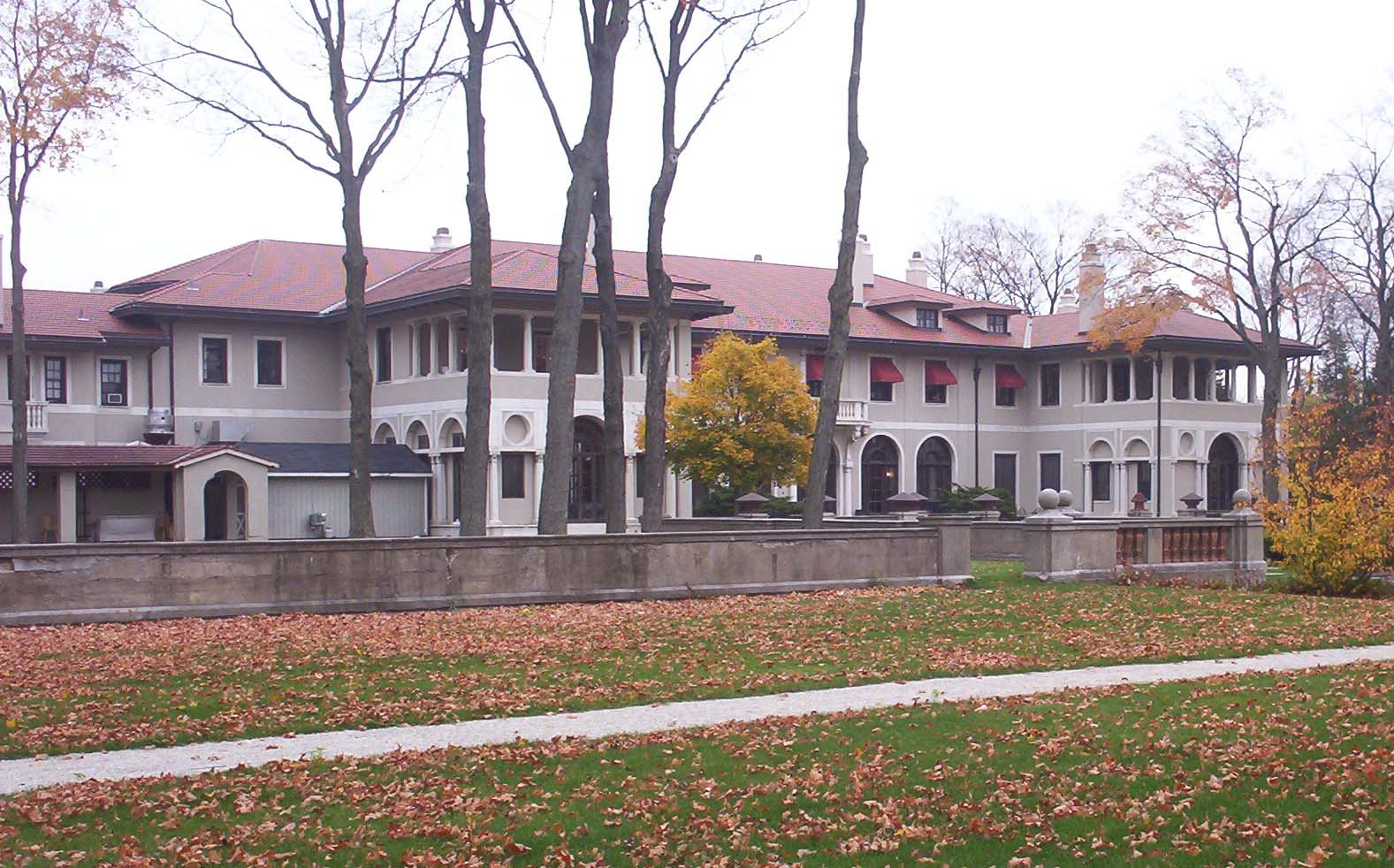
The exterior of the main house at J. Ogden Armour's Mellody Farm in Lake Forest, Illinois.

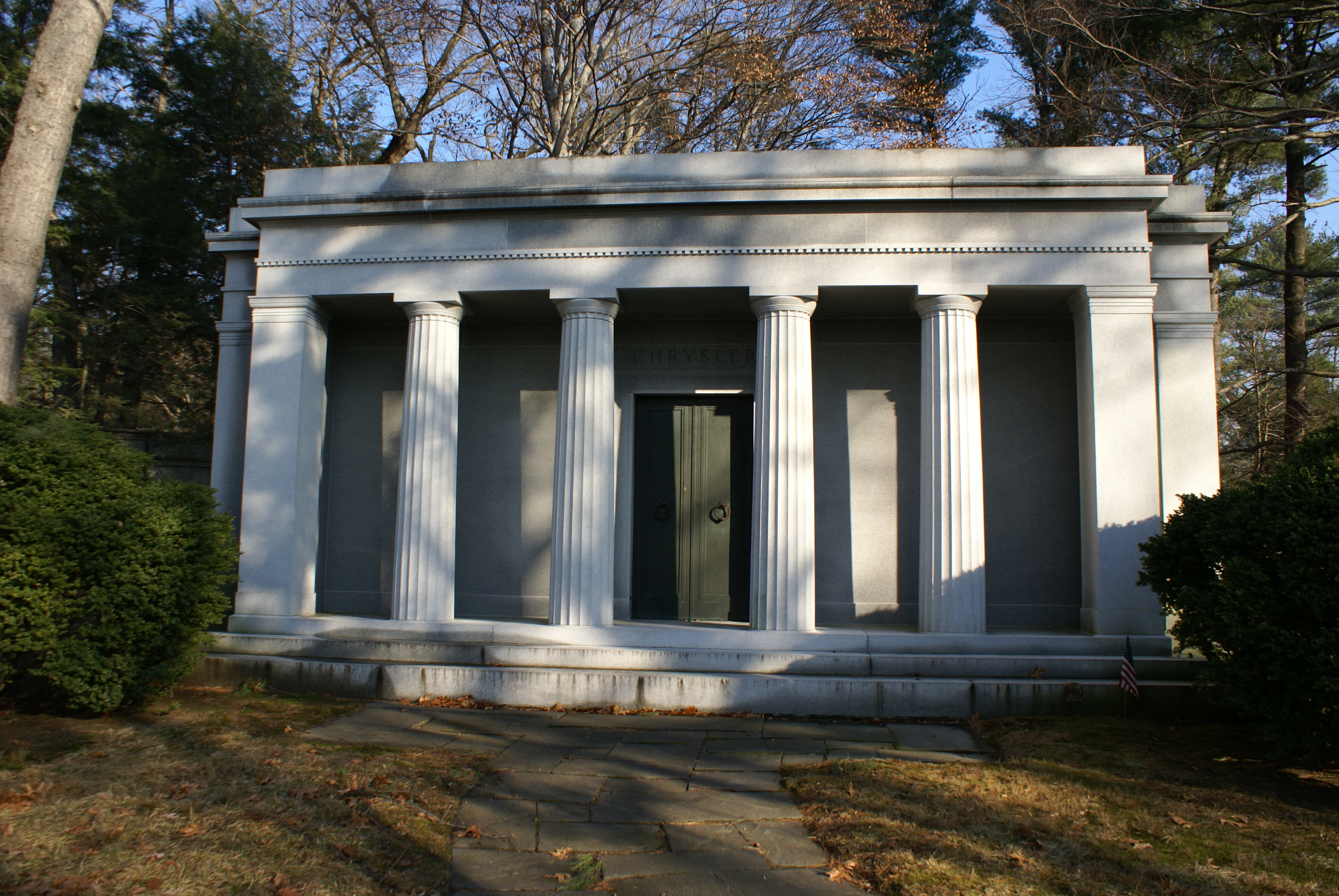
The exterior of the Chrysler Mausoleum in Sleepy Hollow, New York.

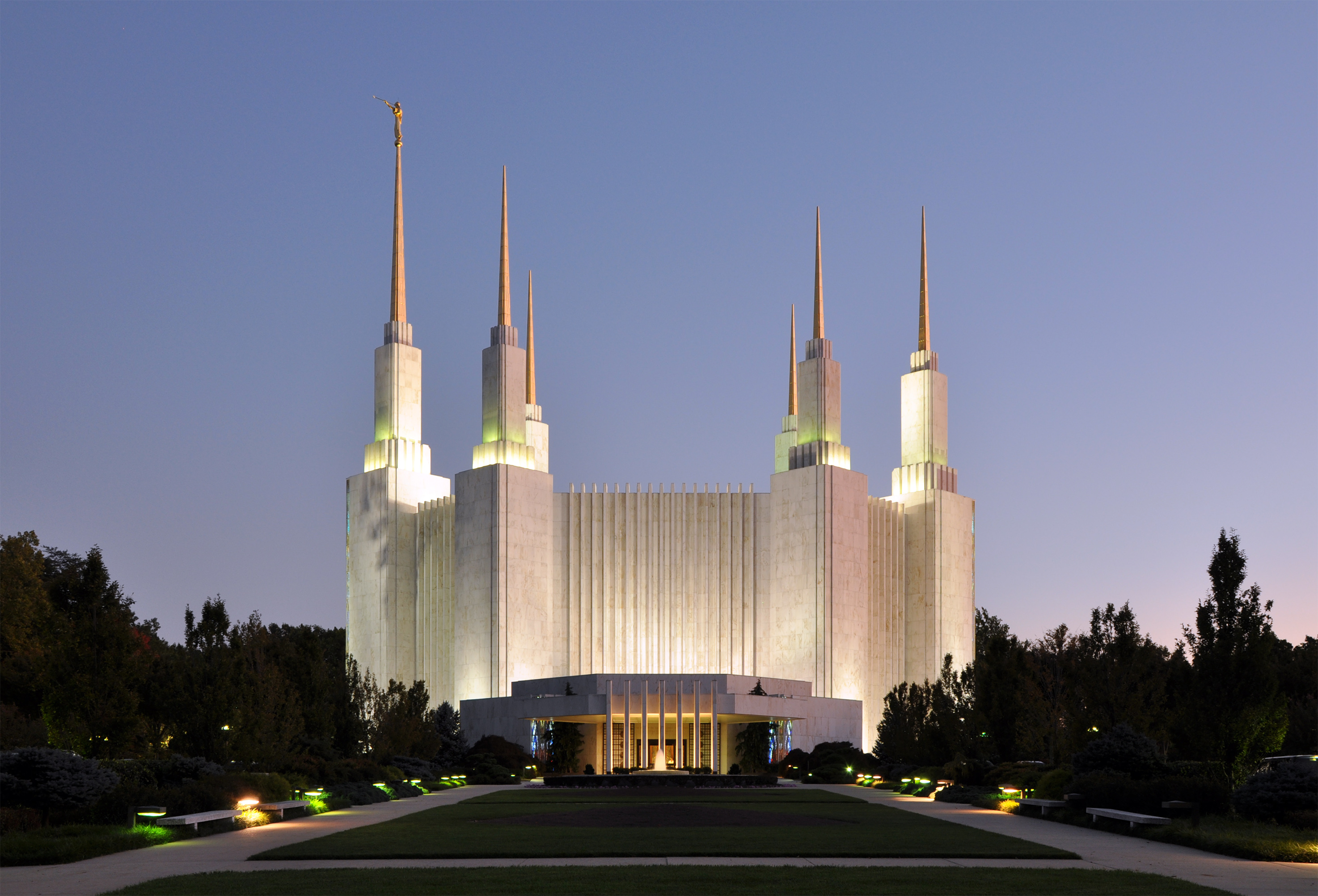
View of The Church of Jesus Christ of Latter-day Saints' Temple located just outside Washington, D.C.

== See also ==
- List of types of marble
