= Tracy and Swartwout =

American architectural firm

Tracy and Swartwout was a prominent New York City architectural firm headed by Evarts Tracy and Egerton Swartwout.

== History ==
Evarts Tracy (1868–1922) was the son of first cousins Jeremiah Evarts Tracy and Martha Sherman Greene. His paternal grandmother Martha Sherman Evarts and maternal grandmother Mary Evarts were the sisters of William M. Evarts. Evarts Tracey graduated from Yale in 1890.

Egerton Swartwout (1870–1943) was the first son of Satterlee Swartwout and Charlotte Elizabeth Edgerton (daughter of Ohio Representative Alfred Peck Edgerton). Swartwout graduated from Yale University in 1891.

Both Swartwout and Tracy had trained and worked as draftsmen with the renowned firm, McKim, Mead and White.

From 1904-1909, Tracy and Swartwout were joined by architect James Riely Gordon, forming the firm Gordon, Tracy & Swartwout.

In 1909-1912 the firm was joined by Electus Darwin Litchfield, a graduate of the Brooklyn Polytechnic Institute and the Stevens Institute of Technology. The firm was at this time named Tracy, Swartwout & Litchfield.

Evarts Tracy died January 31, 1922, in France, of chronic myocarditis. Egerton Swartwout continued working on his own after Evarts Tracy's death.

== Buildings ==
Date	Name	Image	Location	Notes
1900	Former Yale Club		30 West 44th Street, New York	Former Yale Club, now the Penn Club
1901	home for Evarts Tracy		1009 Hillside Ave. Plainfield NJ	
1902	The Webster Hotel		40 West 45th Street, New York	Added to National Register of Historic Places, 1984
1903	Muhlenberg Regional Medical Center		Park Ave. and Randolph Road Plainfield, NJ	currently in danger of being demolished
1906	Pliny Fisk House		New York City (11, 13, 15 E. 45th Street)	
1906	Skull and Bones, cloister-garden		New Haven, Connecticut	For the Yale University secret society. Evarts Tracy is believed to have been an 1890 member of the society, and William M. Evarts was an 1837 member
1905-1907	National Metropolitan Bank Building		Washington, D.C.	designed by B. Stanley Simmons added to National Register of Historic Places, 1978
1907	Albert Moyer House		324 N. Ridgewood Rd. S. Orange, NJ	
1907-1909	Somerset County Courthouse		Somerville, New Jersey	
1908	Stamford YMCA		909 Washington Blvd, Stamford, CT	now Hotel Zero Degrees attached to YMCA
1908-1911	Cathedral of St. John in the Wilderness, Denver		Denver, Colorado	Added to National Register of Historic Places, 1975
1915	Astor Market		95th and Broadway NY, NY	demolished
1915	George Washington Memorial Hall		Washington, D.C.	construction was started but never completed
1916	U.S. Post Office and Federal Building		Denver, Colorado	Added to National Register of Historic Places, 1973
1917	Missouri State Capitol		Jefferson City, Missouri	Beaux-Arts
1919	Ridgewood High School		Ridgewood, New Jersey	
