= Byron White United States Courthouse =

- U.S. Post Office and Federal Building
- U.S. National Register of Historic Places
- Colorado State Register of Historic Properties
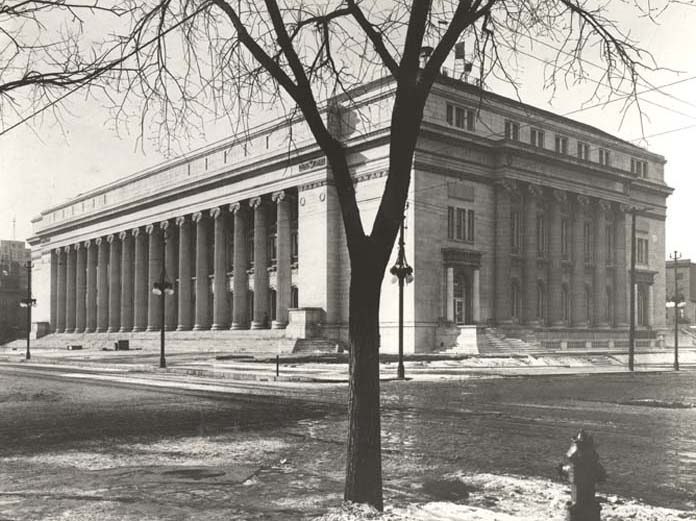
- United States Federal Courthouse in Denver, Colorado, 1916

- Location within Colorado Location within the United States
- Location: 18th and Stout Sts., Denver, Colorado
- Coordinates: 39°44′55″N 104°59′23″W
- Area: 2 acres (0.81 ha)
- Built: 1916
- Built by: Hedden Construction Co.
- Architect: Egerton Swartwout
- Architectural style: Classical Revival
- NRHP reference No.: 73000470
- CSRHP No.: 5DV.201
- Added to NRHP: March 20, 1973

The Byron White United States Courthouse is a courthouse in Denver, Colorado, currently the seat of the United States Court of Appeals for the Tenth Circuit. It formerly housed courthouses of the United States District Court for the District of Colorado. Completed between 1910 and 1916, the building was listed in the National Register of Historic Places in 1973, as U.S. Post Office and Federal Building. In 1994, it was renamed in honor of U.S. Supreme Court Justice Byron White (1917–2002) a native of Fort Collins, Colorado.

== Building history ==
The grand Neo-Classical design of the Byron White U.S. Courthouse brought design elements popular in the eastern United States to Denver. The monumental scale and elegance expressed its official and public character, and served as inspiration for other civic buildings in the city.

By 1900, Denver was a major transportation crossroads and a significant western commercial city. The monumental 1893 U.S. Post Office was already considered outdated, leading the people of Denver to seek a new, larger building for the Post Office and Federal Courts.

Authorization for a new building was approved as early as 1903, but funds were not appropriated until 1908. In 1909, Office of the Supervising Architect of the Treasury Department James Knox Taylor selected New York architects Tracy, Swartwout, and Litchfield to design Denver's new Post Office and Courthouse. Egerton Swartwout designed the building, Evarts Tracy was working on nearby Cathedral of St. John in the Wilderness at that same time. It was one of only thirty-five Federal buildings built during Taylor's tenure (1883–1912) that were designed by independent architects commissioned by the U.S. Treasury Department under the Tarsney Act. Passed in 1893, the Act authorized the Treasury Secretary to use private architects, selected through architectural competitions, to design Federal buildings. The Act reflected the growing demand for greater architectural standards for public buildings and opened the way for additional appropriations to maintain those standards.

Evarts Tracy (1868–1922) and Egerton Swartwout (1870–1943) graduated from Yale University and worked as draftsmen in the New York office of McKim, Mead, and White before establishing Tracy and Swartwout in New York in 1900. Electus Darwin Litchfield (1872–1952), a graduate of the Brooklyn Polytechnic Institute and the Stevens Institute of Technology, joined the partnership in 1908.

Construction began in 1910, but progress was slow due to insufficient funds. The initial appropriation of $1,500,000 was supplemented with an additional $400,000 as a result of Denver Postmaster Joseph H. Harrison's lobbying effort in Washington, DC. The building opened in January 1916.

== Architecture ==
With its monumental presence and dramatic public spaces, the courthouse is an excellent example of the Neoclassical architecture that dominated federal building design at the turn of the 20th century. Occupying an entire city block in downtown Denver and standing four stories in height, the building reflects the academic characteristics of the Neoclassical style with its symmetrical design, classical details, and imposing manner.

A Poem in Marble, A Place on the Map: Byron R. White U.S. Courthouse, Denver, Colorado

Clad in Colorado Yule Marble—the material used for the exterior of the Lincoln Memorial and the Tomb of the Unknown Soldier in Washington, D.C.—the U.S. Courthouse is set above the street on a rusticated base. A series of grand stairs lead up to the main entrance on the southeast elevation (Stout Street), which is marked by sixteen, three-story, Ionic order columns adorned with eagles. The secondary elevations incorporate similar, but less pronounced, engaged Ionic columns. Set above the third story, a decorative band of medallions and eagles form the base of the large ornamental cornice.

The frieze above the main entrance has city names, with cities located east of Denver inscribed to the east of the central bay and those located to the city's west inscribed to the bay's west, symbolizing the flow of mail across the country. The solid marble walls on either side of the colonnade are inscribed with the names of former U.S. postmasters general. Inscriptions selected and designed by architect Evarts Tracy mark the secondary elevations of the building. The frieze facing Eighteenth Street reads "Lex Nemini Iniquum, Nemini Injuriam Facit" (a quotation from Cicero, "The law causes wrong or injury to no one"), and the Nineteenth Street side reads "Nulli Negabimus, Nulli Differemus, Jutitiam" (a quotation from the Magna Carta, "To no one shall we deny justice, nor shall we discriminate in its application"). Marble seats on the northeast and southwest sides of the building are inscribed, "Alternate rest and labor long endure," and "If thou desire rest, desire not too much."

The main entry lobby spans the width of the building, with windows opening out through the portico. It has a terrazzo floor and vaulted ceiling with arches springing from the pilasters. Names of Pony Express riders adorn the marble-faced walls. The U.S. Court of Appeals is located on the second floor along with the Law Library and a District Courtroom. The Law Library (now Courtroom Four) is clad with carved oak panels. An eagle and the Latin inscription, "Lux et Veritas" (light and truth), crown the exit. The U.S. District Courtroom A with its arched ceiling and pink-tinged white marble walls retains its original gold-trimmed black velvet drapery in the apse behind the judge's bench.

The U.S. Courthouse is embellished with notable artwork. A pair of Indiana Limestone sculptures of Rocky Mountain sheep commissioned from Denver artist Gladys Caldwell Fisher (1907–1952) sit at the southwest entrance. Fisher completed the sculptures, with help from two assistants, working under the Works Progress Administration in 1936. Prominent artwork within the building includes four canvas murals by Herman Schladermundt (1863–1937). The murals, Fortune Turns on Her Wheel—The Fate of Kings, Postal Service, Labor is Great Producer of Wealth, and Nil Sine Numine (Nothing Without Power), were completed in 1918 and shipped from New York.

Extensive building renovations were made in the 1950s and on into the 1960s when the U.S. Postal Service altered the lobby and first floor, constructed a concrete-block addition, demolished the Appellate Courtroom and Grand Jury Room, and removed original columns for expansion of the third floor. From 1992-1994 some of the alterations were reversed when the building was rehabilitated for use as the United States Court of Appeals for the Tenth Circuit. The Appellate Courtroom and the Grand Jury Room on the third floor were reconstructed. The lobby, Ceremonial Courtroom, Courtroom Two, Courtroom Four, and District Courtroom A were restored to their original grandeur. The restoration received numerous preservation awards.

== Significant events ==
- 1893: Passage of the Tarsney Act permits the Federal Government to hire private architects through competitions.
- 1908-1909: Funds are appropriated and a site purchased for a new Federal building; the New York firm of Tracy, Swartwout and Litchfield designs the U.S. Post Office and Federal Building.
- 1910-1916: The U.S. Post Office and Federal Building is constructed.
- 1918: Four canvas lobby murals by Herman T. Schladermundt of New York are installed.
- 1936:Stone sculptures of Rocky Mountain sheep by artist Gladys Caldwell Fisher are installed.
- 1950s: Extensive system modifications are made to the building; the third floor is expanded and the fourth floor altered for new courtrooms.
- 1962-1966: The U.S. Postal Service controls building and undertakes substantive alterations for its own use.
- 1973: The U.S. Post Office and Federal Building is listed in National Register of Historic Places.
- 1992-1994: U.S. General Services Administration undertakes an extensive renovation/ restoration of the building.
- 1994: The building is renamed and dedicated as the Byron White United States Courthouse.
- 1994-1997: Preservation of the Byron White United States Courthouse is recognized by numerous preservation awards.

== Gallery ==
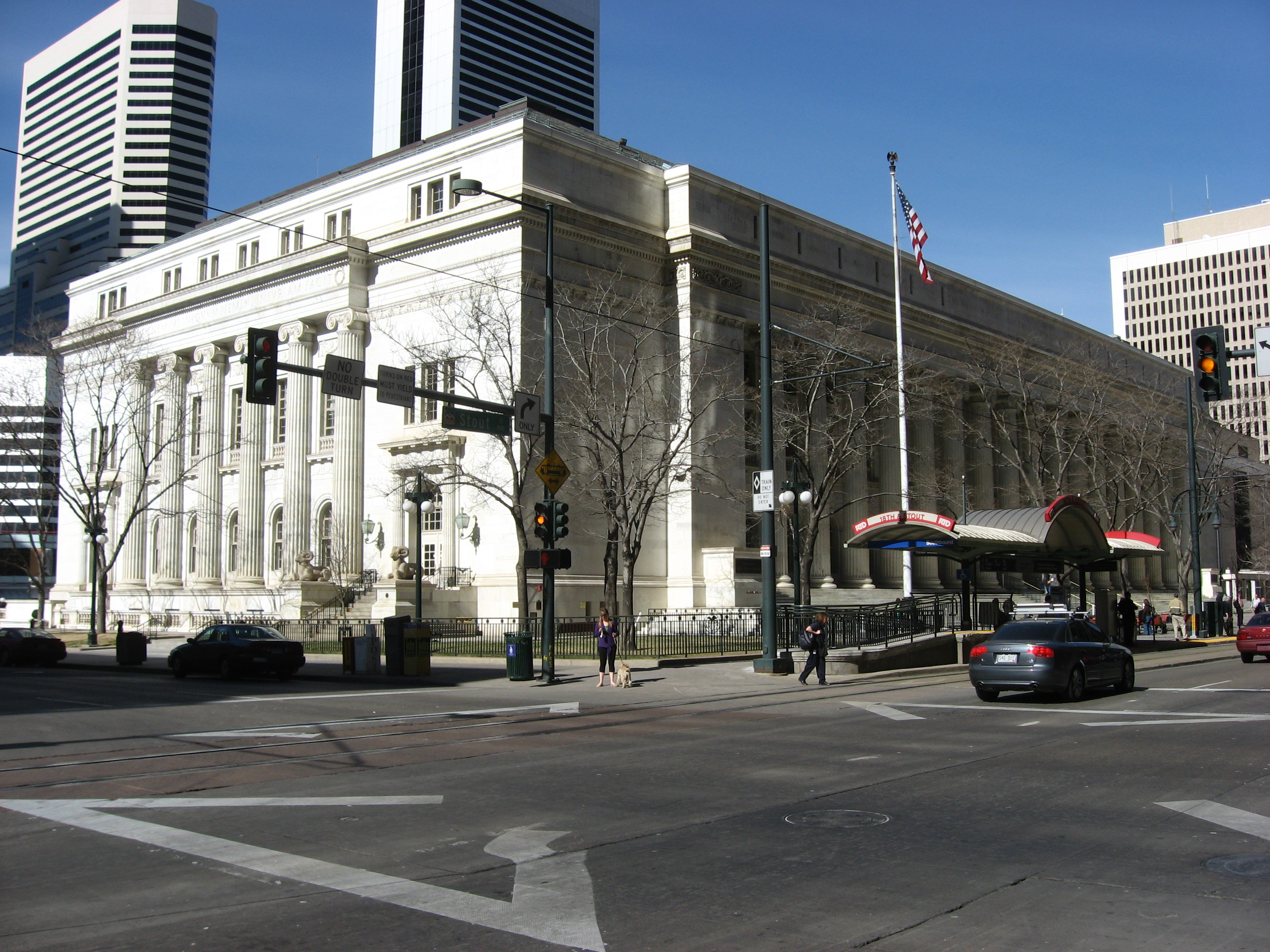
U.S. Post Office and Federal Building, March 2009

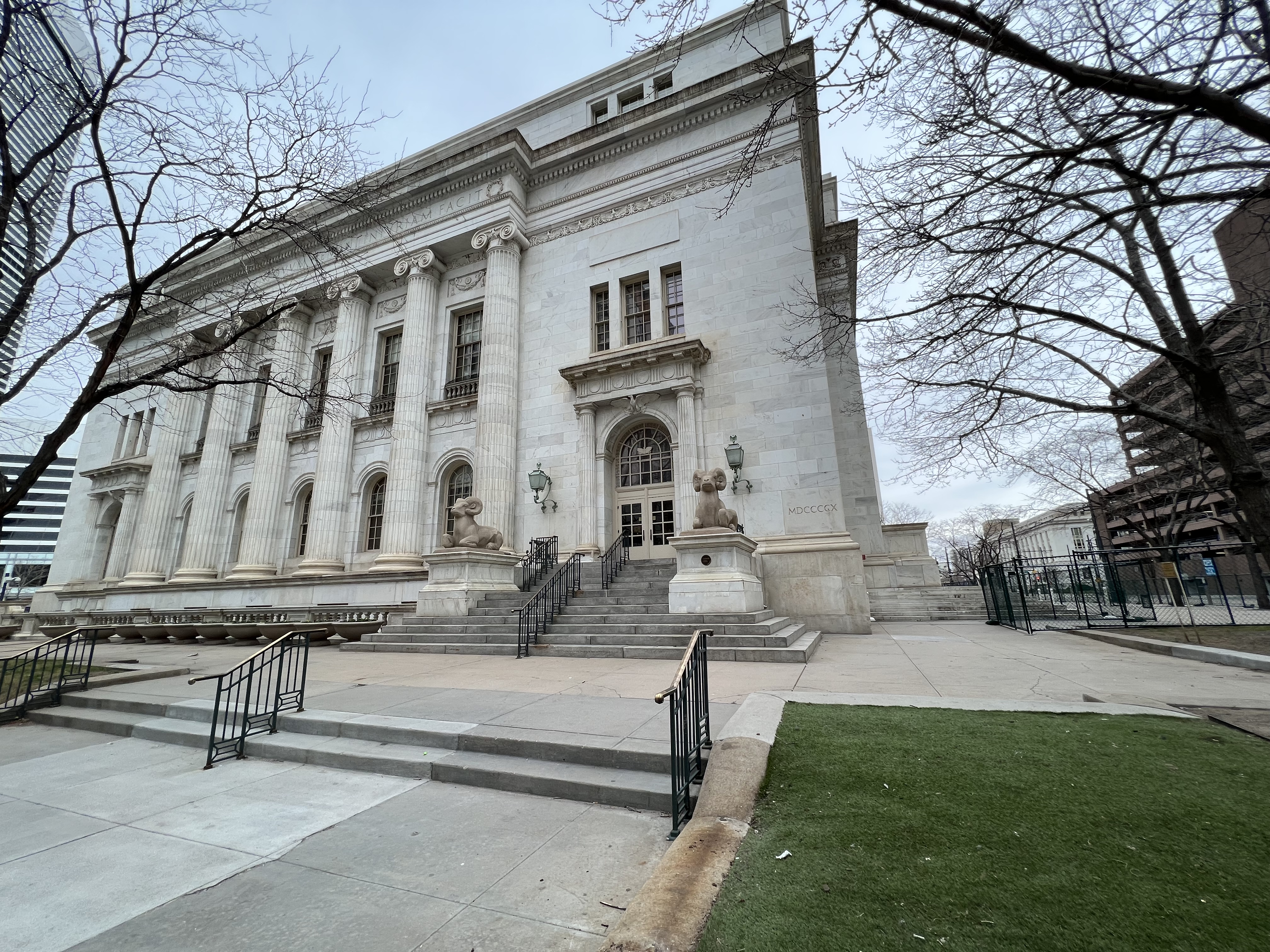
Courthouse in April, 2022

== See also ==
- Yule marble
- List of United States post offices
