= Egerton Swartwout =

American architect

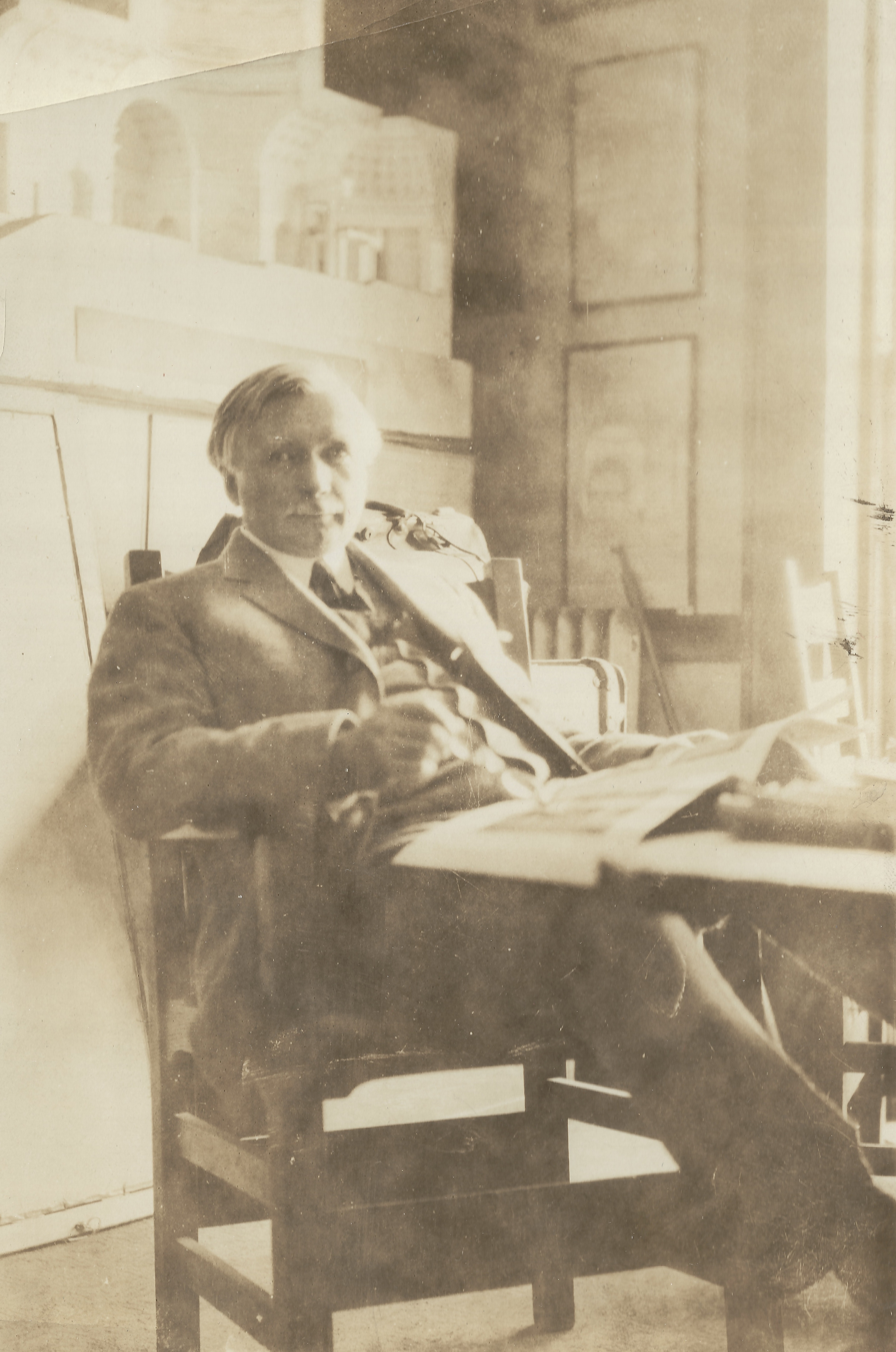
- Swartwout in 1922
- Born: March 3, 1870; Fort Wayne, Indiana
- Died: February 18, 1943 (aged 72); New York City, New York
- Occupation: Architect
- Spouse: Isabelle Geraldine Davenport (m. 1904)
- Children: 2, including Robert Egerton Swartwout
- Practice: Tracy and Swartwout
- Burial place: Sleepy Hollow Cemetery
- Education: Yale University, B.A. (1891)
- Relatives: Alfred Peck Edgerton (grandfather); Robert Swartwout (great-grandfather)

Egerton Swartwout (March 3, 1870 – February 18, 1943) was an American architect, most notably associated with his New York City architectural firm Tracy and Swartwout and McKim, Mead & White. His buildings, numbering over 100, were typically in the Beaux-Arts style. Six of his buildings are recognized on the National Register of Historic Places, and three others have been given landmark status by their city commissions.

== Family ==
Egerton was born March 3, 1870, in Fort Wayne, Indiana, the first son of Satterlee Swartwout (grandson of Robert Swartwout) and Charlotte Elizabeth Edgerton (daughter of Alfred Peck Edgerton). Egerton married British-born Isabelle Geraldine Davenport, June 20, 1904, in Cambridge, England. They had two children, Robert Egerton Swartwout and Charlotte Elizabeth. Robert, better known as R.E. Swartwout, was an author and the first American to cox the Cambridge University rowing team to victory over Oxford University, in 1930.

== Training and career ==
Egerton Swartwout graduated from Yale University in 1891 with a B.A. degree. He had no formal training in architecture, but spent two summers during college working in small architecture offices. After graduating from Yale he presented a letter of introduction to Stanford White of McKim, Mead and White. White took him into the firm as an unpaid student, and after a few months he was hired as a draftsman.

Swartwout spent ten years at the firm and rose through the ranks of draftsmen. He worked primarily for Charles McKim, assisting in the design of several of McKim's major buildings, including the Low Memorial Library at Columbia University. The four internal staircases at the corners of the rotunda leading to four exits were Swartwout's contribution. He wrote in his memoir that he later regretted the idea, because when he used the library he could never manage to find the same stairs going down that he had used to come up, and when he was in a hurry to catch a train he often found himself leaving by the wrong exit in the rear of the building.

Swartwout produced drawings for the University Club of New York, another of McKim's important commissions, and borrowed some of its details for his design of the Missouri State Capitol. He worked with socialite Theodate Pope Riddle on the design of Hill-Stead for her parents. When he left McKim, Mead and White, Swartwout had charge of thirteen building projects.

In 1900 he teamed with co-worker and fellow Yale graduate Evarts Tracy, to form Tracy and Swartwout. The new firm designed many significant buildings, including the Missouri State Capitol, Saint John's Cathedral, and the U.S. Post Office and Federal Building. After Tracy's death in 1922, Swartwout continued in solo practice.

During his career, Swartwout developed guidelines for judging architectural competitions for the American Institute of Architects, making it possible for young architects to succeed. One of the first architects to incorporate acoustics in his designs, Wallace Clement Sabine, served as consultant on many of Swartwout's buildings. Swartwout sat on the American Battle Monuments Commission and served as vice chairman of the American Academy of the Fine Arts. Tracy and Swartwout were awarded the Medal of Honor by the New York Chapter of the American Institute of Architects in 1920 for distinguished achievements in architecture as exemplified by the Missouri State Capitol and Denver Post Office. Egerton served three terms as president of the New York Chapter of the American Institute of Architects. He was made an honorary member of the Société Nationale des Beaux-Arts in 1915. Swartwout was a member of the U.S. Commission of Fine Arts from 1931 to 1936, the American Academy of Arts and Letters, and the National Academy of Design.

== Death ==
Swartwout died in New York City, New York, on February 18, 1943. Architect Eric Gugler served as executor for his estate. Swartwout is buried alongside his mother and daughter in Sleepy Hollow Cemetery, Sleepy Hollow, New York.

== Select buildings ==
- Hill-Stead (1898–1901) Farmington, Connecticut (in conjunction with Theodate Pope Riddle)
- 30 West 44th Street (1901) New York City, New York (formerly The Yale Club of New York City)
- Albany Public Bath House #2 (1905) 90 4th Ave, Albany, New York
- The Connecticut Savings Bank (1906) 45 Church Street, New Haven, Connecticut
- Somerset County Courthouse (1907–1909) Somerville, New Jersey
- U.S. Post Office and Federal Building (1908–14) Denver, Colorado
- Saint John's Cathedral (1908–1911) Denver, Colorado
- Ferguson Library (1910) Stamford, Connecticut, a two-story Georgian Revival brick building in what is now the Downtown Stamford Historic District
- Missouri State Capitol (1913–1918) Jefferson City, Missouri
- Mary Baker Eddy Memorial (1915) Mount Auburn Cemetery, Cambridge, Massachusetts
- Milford City Hall (1916) Milford, Connecticut
- Elks National Veterans Memorial (1923–1926) Chicago, Illinois
- National Baptist Memorial Church (1924) Washington, D.C.
- Yale University Art Gallery, Old Building (1926–1927) New Haven, Connecticut
- Macon City Auditorium (1928) Macon, Georgia
- Montsec American Monument, Montsec, Meuse (1927) France for the American Battle Monuments Commission
- Bailey Fountain in Grand Army Plaza (1929–1932) Brooklyn, New York
- Brookwood American Cemetery Chapel (1929) Brookwood, Surrey, England
