= Robert Swartwout =

United States Army general

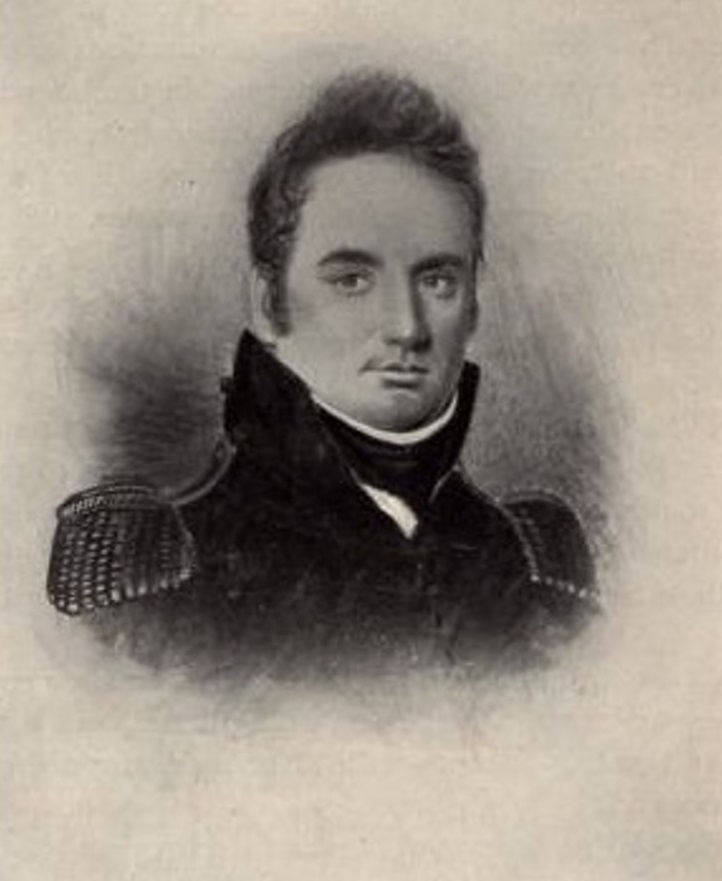
- From 1899's The Swartwout Chronicles 1338-1899 and the Ketelhuyn Chronicles 1451-1899
- Born: December 8, 1779; Poughkeepsie, New York, U.S.
- Died: July 17, 1848 (aged 68); New York City, U.S.
- Burial place: Trinity Church Cemetery, New York, New York
- Spouse: Margaret Bradford Dunscomb
- Children: 7
- Relatives: Samuel Swartwout (brother)
- Military career
- Allegiance: United States
- Service: United States Army
- Service years: 1812–1816
- Rank: Brigadier General
- Unit: U.S. Army Quartermaster Corps
- Commands: 4th Brigade; Quartermaster General of the United States Army
- Wars: War of 1812
- Other work: Businessman; Merchant

Brigadier General Robert Swartwout (December 8, 1779 – July 17, 1848) was an American military officer, merchant, alderman, and Navy agent of New York City. He was born in Poughkeepsie, New York, the son of the American Revolutionary War military veteran Captain Abraham Swartwout (1743–1799) and descendant of Tomys Swartwout.

== Political alliances ==
Robert Swartwout was a loyal friend and supporter of Aaron Burr. He shot Richard Riker, a supporter of Alexander Hamilton, in the leg in a duel on November 14, 1803.

== Early life and military career ==
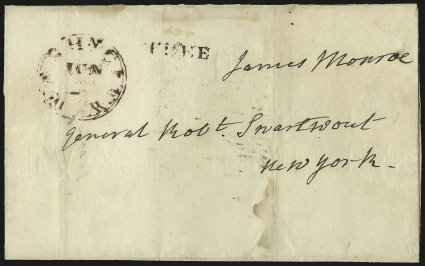
President Monroe to General Swartwout

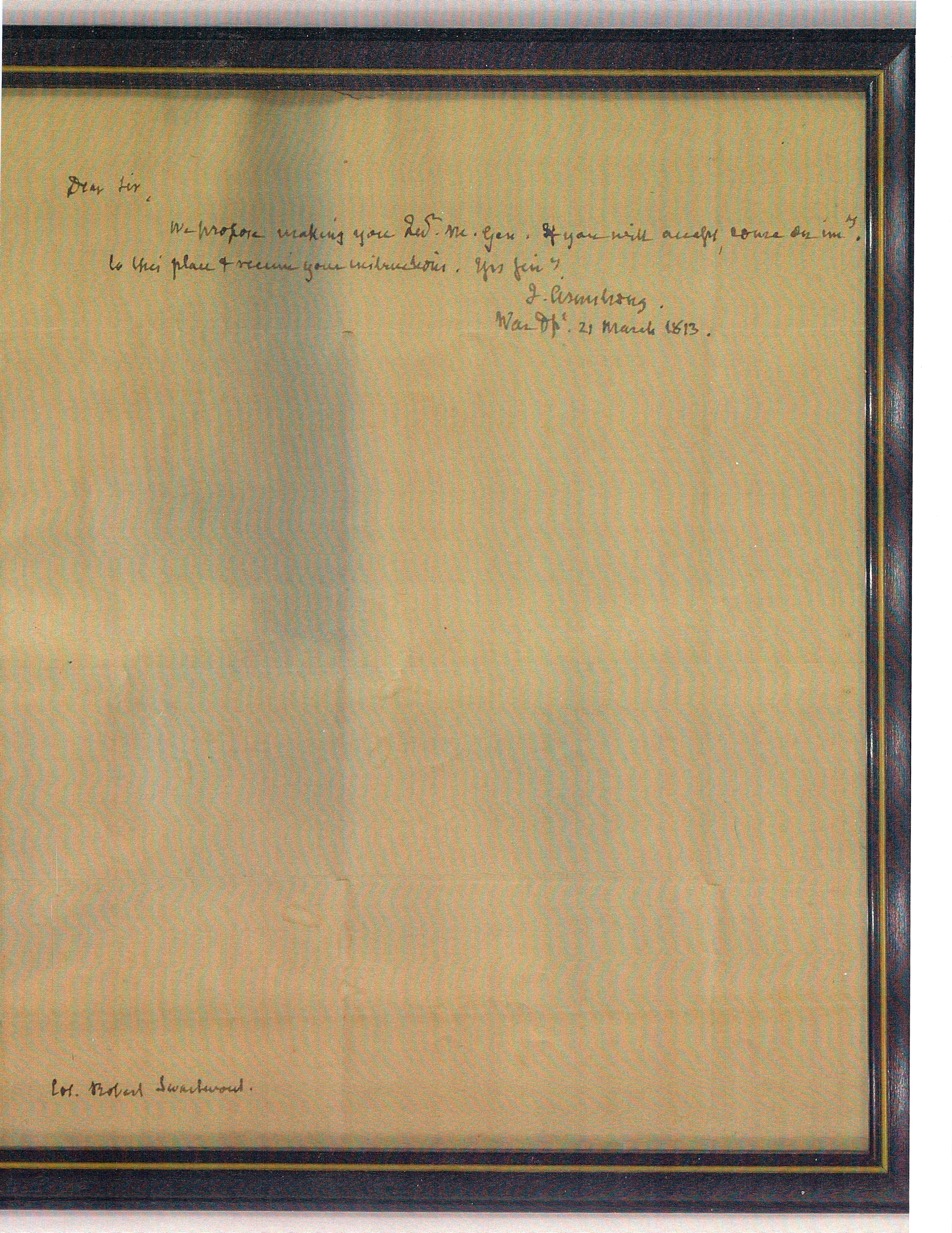
John Armstrong to Robert Swartwout

Swartwout was born in Poughkeepsie, New York into a military and merchant family of Dutch ancestry. He was the second-born, and ultimately had four brothers and one sister.

After finishing school, Swartwout intended to study at Columbia College. However, as his family was highly indebted and could not afford to pay the tuition fees, he chose to join the military. He began his military career in the War of 1812 as militia colonel at New York Harbor from August to November 1812. He commanded the 4th Brigade in the campaign of 1813 on the St. Lawerence. Following the death of General Leonard Covington at the Battle of Crysler's Farm, he was appointed Brigadier General and 9th Quartermaster General of the US Army on March 21, 1813, by President James Madison through Secretary of War John Armstrong. Later President James Monroe reappointed him Quartermaster General, and he served in that capacity until June 5, 1816.

War of 1812, Quartermaster General Swartwout dispatched the letter to Major General and later 9th President of the United States William Henry Harrison, June 2, 1813 announcing the American victory at the Second Battle of Sackett's Harbor on May 29, 1813.

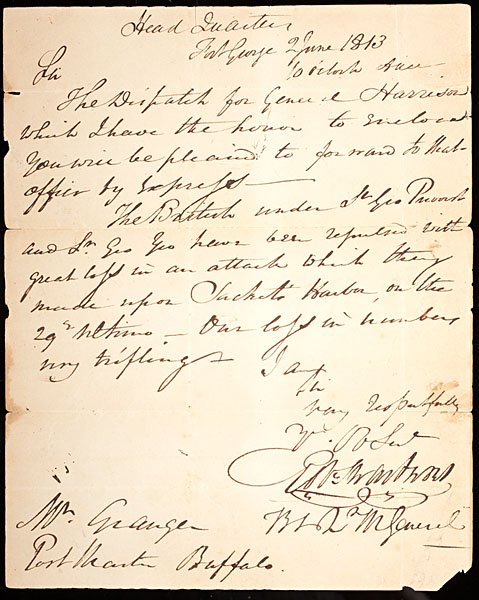
Letter from General Swartwout, June 2, 1813

== Real estate, "Swartwout" New Jersey Meadowlands, and banking ==
After the war, Swartwout moved to New York City. He resumed his merchant career and acquired a charter on January 28, 1820, to start the New Jersey Salt Marsh Company with his brothers John and Samuel. They acquired several thousand acres between Newark and Hoboken for what was referred to as the "Swartwout" New Jersey Meadowlands, and started the first large scale reclamation project to dike and drain the meadows for habitation and agriculture.

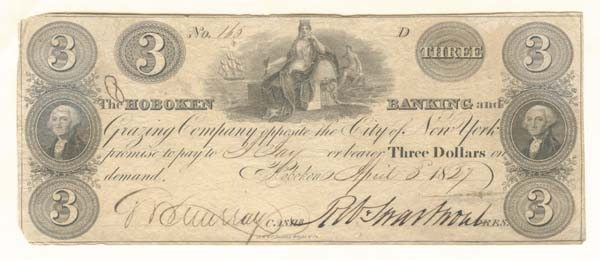
Hoboken Banking and Grazing Company bank note

New Jersey granted a charter for 15 years to Robert Swartwout and Charles Haines to establish the Hoboken Banking and Grazing Company in 1822, to issue stock for New Jersey Salt Marsh Company. They were authorized to erect one of the first banking houses, and did so in Hoboken on 2nd street and Washington on November 15, 1822

In 1818, Swartwout was appointed as naval agent for New York City. He also served in local politics as an alderman in Ward Five.

== Family ==
On January 7, 1808, Swartwout married Margaret Bradford Dunscomb, in New York City, New York. Together they had three daughters, Catherine Hone, Mary, and Margaret Dunscomb Swartwout. They also had four sons, three of whom served in the US Army. Henry died while serving in the Army in Florida in 1811; Edward and John served in the Union Army during the Civil War. Robert Swartwout Jr. (1815–1898) was a merchant and owned the New York Rice Mill, through whom he was grandfather of Egerton Swartwout.

== Death ==
Swartwout's death occurred on July 17, 1848, between 2 and 3pm, in the auction store of W.C. Holley at 6 Pine Street. While in conversation, Swartwout said, "I feel as if I were going to fall, hold me," to the gentleman with whom had been conversing. That man assisted Swartwout to the floor, after which he breathed several times and died of apoplexy. He was buried across the street in the Matthew Livingston Davis family vault at Trinity Churchyard. He had a seat on the Board of Aldermen from the third ward at the time of his death.
