= Webster Hotel =

Hotel in Manhattan, New York

- U.S. National Register of Historic Places
- New York State Register of Historic Places
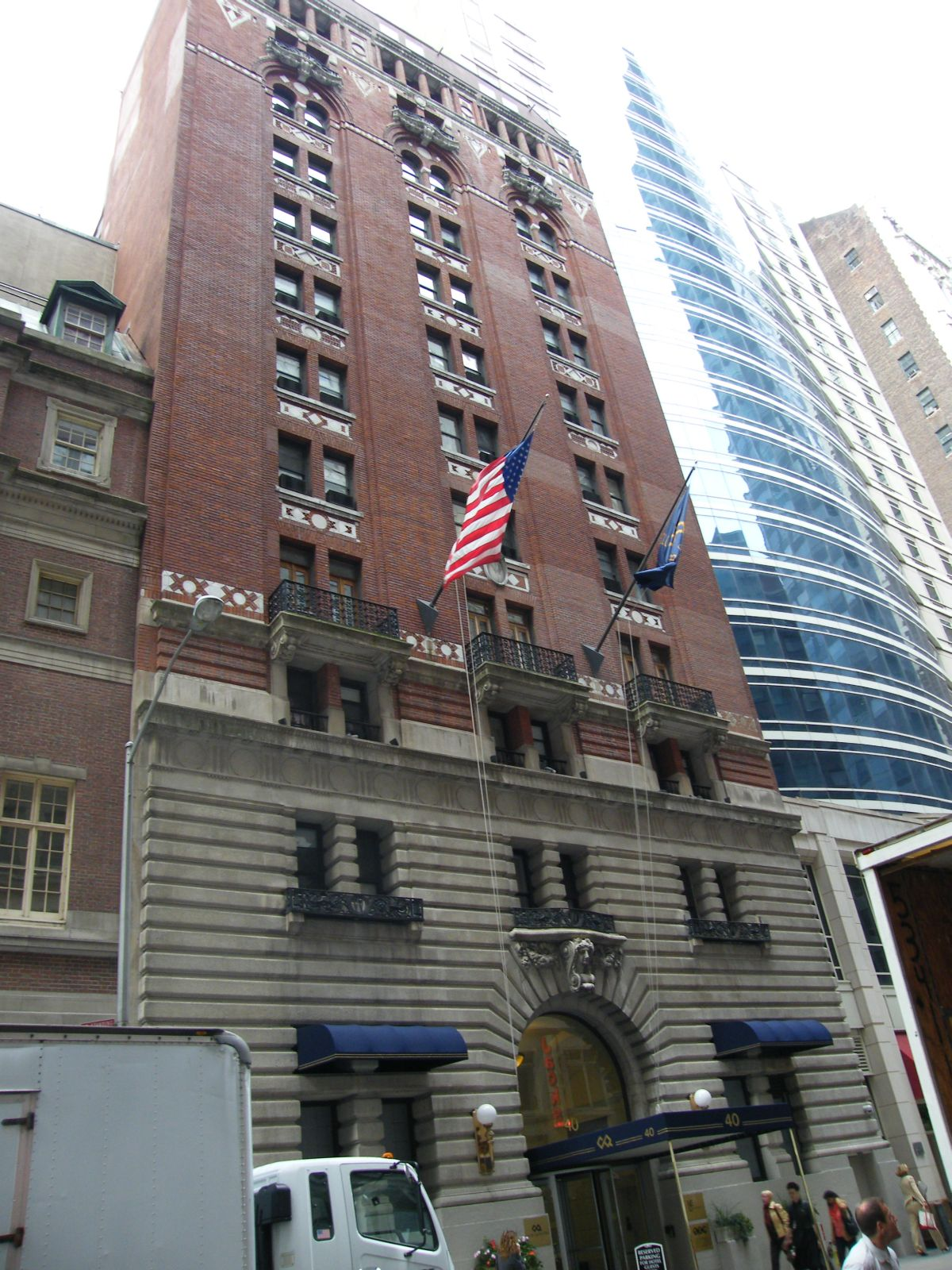
- The Midtown Executive Club in 2008.

- Location within New York City Location within New York Location within the United States
- Location: 40 West 45th Street, New York, New York
- Coordinates: 40°45′21″N 73°58′52.7″W
- Area: less than one acre
- Built: 1902
- Architect: Tracy & Swartwout
- Architectural style: Classical Revival
- NRHP reference No.: 84002806
- NYSRHP No.: 06101.001789

Significant dates
- Added to NRHP: September 7, 1984
- Designated NYSRHP: August 3, 1984

The Webster Hotel is located in New York City. The building was built in 1902 and was added to the National Register of Historic Places on September 7, 1984. It was designed by the architectural firm of Tracy and Swartwout, and built in the Classical Revival style.

It functions today as The Midtown Executive Club, it is also marketed as a hotel to the general public under the name Club Quarters, Midtown.

== Famous visitors ==
Colombian novelist Gabriel García Márquez stayed with his family in the Webster Hotel during a period when he moved from Havana to New York City to work for Cuban press agency Prensa Latina.

The hotel was the first marital home of Franklin D. Roosevelt and his wife Eleanor while he attended Columbia Law School.

== See also ==
- National Register of Historic Places listings in Manhattan from 14th to 59th Streets
