= Swartwout–Hoyt scandal =

Embezzlement of U.S. government funds

The Swartwout-Hoyt scandal was a political scandal in 1829. It arose from corruption in the Office of the Collector of the Port of New York.

== Background ==
In 1829, President Andrew Jackson appointed Samuel Swartwout to serve as Collector of the Port of New York. Nine years later, Swartwout left office at the expiration of his term in 1838, retaining $201,096.40 with which to pay any pending claims that might be brought against him. He then went to England to raise money on his coal property before ensuring that his account at the customhouse was closed. After he left the country, or perhaps before, his account was "adjusted" by a subordinate and possibly by his successor, through the instigation of President Martin Van Buren. It was then alleged that Swartwout had embezzled $1,225,705.09 ($36.2 million in 2024 dollars) and fled. One of his assistants was indicted in 1841 for embezzling $609,525.71 of the sum, and, according to Swartwout's trustee, a federal court further reduced the amount by $435,052.21, leaving the remaining amount which Swartwout claimed he owed. Swartwout forfeited his personal property to meet the deficit and returned to the United States in 1841 after federal officials assured him that they would not prosecute him.

President Martin Van Buren then appointed Jesse Hoyt to replace Swartwout and to take corrective measures to prevent any future problems in the Collector's office. However, in 1841, allegations began to circulate that Hoyt had also been embezzling, and Hoyt was removed by Van Buren on February 27.

=== Scandal with the scandal ===
There was also something of a "scandal with the scandal." President John Tyler appointed a special three-person committee, headed by Senator George Poindexter of Mississippi, to investigate the allegations of fraud and embezzlement in the Collector's Office. The committee's report found overwhelming evidence of massive corruption. However, President Tyler had made the political mistake of failing to secure the approval of Congress for the creation of the Poindexter committee; the Congress, miffed at what it viewed as an usurpation of its powers, repudiated President Tyler's action in creating the commission.

=== Legacy ===
It is believed that Swartwout's story is the origin of the term "Swartwouted out", which has since come to define the embezzlement of a large sum of money from the United States government and subsequent escape to a foreign nation to escape punishment.

== See also ==
- Spoils system
- John Brahan – American speculator and slave owner (1774–1834)
