= Robert Egerton Swartwout =

American-born English cartoonist, sportsman and writer (1905–1951)

- An editor has nominated the above file for discussion of its purpose and/or potential deletion. You are welcome to participate in the discussion and help reach a consensus.
- Born: July 2, 1905; New York City, New York, U.S.
- Died: June 2, 1951 (aged 45); Eye, Suffolk, England, U.K.
- Education: Middlesex School; Trinity College, Cambridge
- Occupations: Cartoonist, writer, coxswain
- Relatives: Egerton Swartwout (father)
- Writing career
- Pen name: R. E. Swartwout

Robert Egerton Swartwout (July 2, 1905 – June 2, 1951) was an American-born English cartoonist, coxswain, and writer, including poet.

He was the only son of American architect Egerton Swartwout and British-born Geraldine Davenport Swartwout. He drew from his rowing experience to produce a locked-room mystery about The Boat Race and many poems.

== Rowing ==
Swartwout rowed and coxed for Middlesex School in Concord, Massachusetts, from which he graduated on June 13, 1924. While attending Trinity College, Cambridge, he became the first American to cox Cambridge University Boat Club to victory in The Boat Race 1930 over Oxford. Swartwout was 5' 6", weighed 105 lb (48 kg), and possessed a powerful bass voice.

== Writing ==
At Trinity College, Swartwout earned a Bachelor of Fine Arts in 1928, followed by a master's degree in literature in 1931. That same year, he was president of the Cambridge University Liberal Club; his devotion to David Lloyd George was such that he later became, according to the historian Eric Hobsbawm, a Welsh nationalist.

Swartwout was also a member and debater with the Cambridge Union Society. Under the pen name R. E. Swartwout, he contributed to Granta and Punch, as well as crosswords for The Spectator. He wrote a short Holmesian piece entitled "The Omnibus Murder" and wrote four books:

- Rhymes of the River and other verses, by R. E. Swartwout, W. Heffer and Sons Limited, Cambridge, 1927
- The Monastic Craftsman: An Inquiry into the Services of Monks to Art in Britain and in Europe North of the Alps in the Middle Ages, by R. E. Swartwout, M.Litt. of Trinity College, Cambridge, Cambridge, W. Heffer and Sons Ltd, 1932
- The Boat Race Murder, by R. E. Swartwout, Grayson and Grayson Ltd., Curzon Street, Mayfair, London, 1933. This book from the Cambridge Crime series has been reissued by Ostara Publishing.
- It Might Have Happened. A sketch of the later career of Rupert Lister Audenard, First Earl of Slype, etc. [A political fantasy based on the imaginary extension of the life of Lord Randolph Churchill], by R. Egerton Swartwout, W. Heffer and Sons Cambridge, 1934

In 1931, Swartwout wrote the introduction to Sir William Schwenck Gilbert: A Topsy Turvy Adventure, by Townley Searle, London: Alexander-Ouseley, Ltd., 1931.

== Personal ==
Robert Swartwout became a British subject on June 9, 1933.

== Death ==
Swartwout died unmarried in Hartismere Hospital, Eye, Suffolk, England on June 6, 1951, of esophageal cancer complicated by pulmonary tuberculosis at the age of 45. He was buried in Fenn Ditton Cemetery on June 12, 1951.

== See also ==
- List of Cambridge University Boat Race crews
