= Somerset County Courthouse (New Jersey) =

- Somerset Courthouse Green
- U.S. National Register of Historic Places
- New Jersey Register of Historic Places
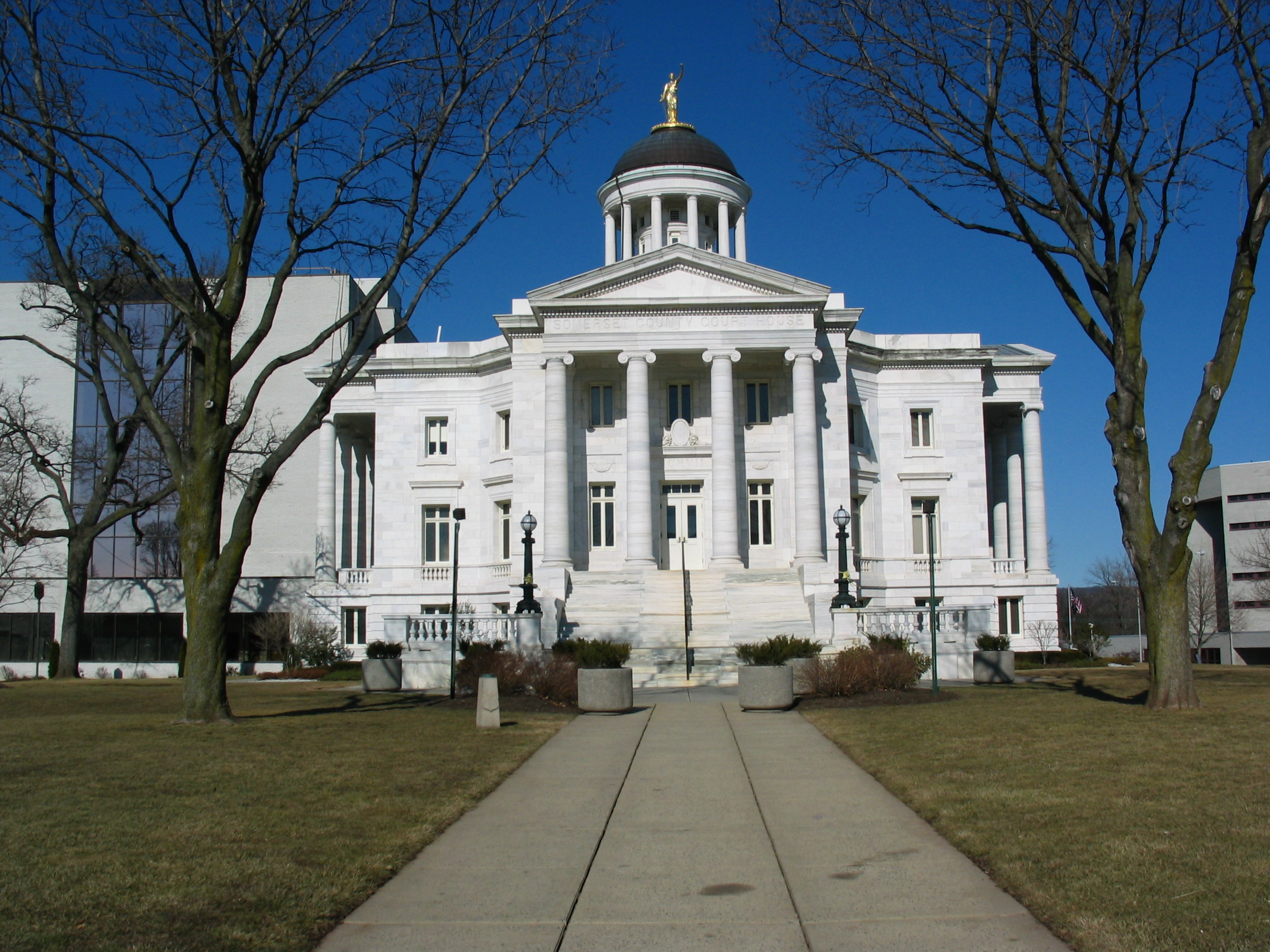
- Somerville Court House

- Location within Somerset County, New Jersey Location within New Jersey Location within the United States
- Location: Roughly E. Main Street from Grove Street to N. Bridge Street, Somerville, NJ 08876
- Coordinates: 40°34′5″N 74°36′40″W
- Area: 2.2 acres (0.89 ha)
- Built: 1907
- Architectural style: Neo-classical style Palladian
- NRHP reference No.: 89001216
- NJRHP No.: 2582

Significant dates
- Added to NRHP: September 7, 1989
- Designated NJRHP: May 26, 1989

The Somerset County Courthouse is located in Somerville, the county seat Somerset County, in the U.S. state of New Jersey.

Constructed in between 1907 and 1909 in the Neo-classical style Palladian style and is faced with Sylacauga marble. It had once been considered for demolition for not being large enough to accommodate the growing county. A much larger, modern masonry and glass structure behind it (left side of photo), now serves its judicial functions. The courthouse underwent a $6 million renovation between 1989 and 1996.

== Historic district ==
Attached to the courthouse is the First Reformed Dutch Church and Cemetery, built in 1898, which has served as the county's Jury Assembly Room since it was renovated around 1985. The courthouse, church, and grounds comprise the Somerset Courthouse Green, which added to the National Register of Historic Places on September 7, 1989.

== History ==
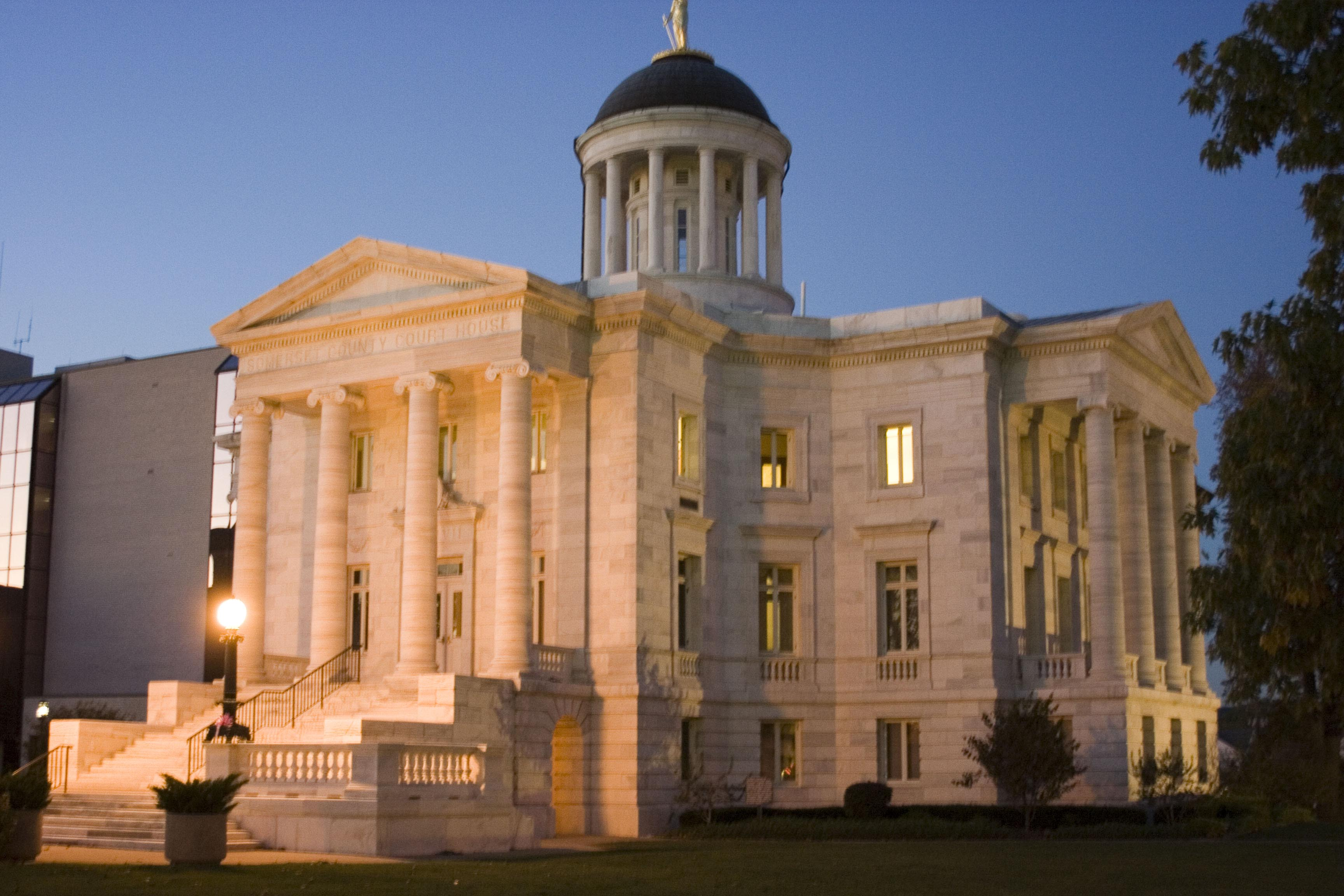
The Court House in Somerville, NJ

When Somerset County was chartered in 1688 most, if not all, judicial affairs were subject to the jurisdiction of the Middlesex County. This all changed in 1714 because the growing community was in need of its own court. The Colonial Assembly passed an act allowing for the building of a court house in Somerset County. County Freeholders chose Six Mile Run (in Franklin Township), as the site to build the new courthouse and jail. In 1737, the jail and courthouse caught fire and burned to the ground. Everything was destroyed. The Freeholders then decided, due to the fire and due to the inaccessibility of the courthouse, to move its location to present-day Millstone. This courthouse served the county until about 1779. This is when invading British forces burned down the courthouse and again most of the records were lost. A committee was appointed by the county in 1782 to build a new courthouse. The Committee met with members of the Dutch Reformed Church (the Consistory of the Church of Raritan) and voted to join and build a courthouse. This association between the court and the church lasted until 1788 when the Dutch Reformed Church relinquished its previous agreements for use of the courthouse, located in Somerville.

The Hall–Mills murder case was tried in this court in 1926.

== See also ==
- County courthouses in New Jersey
- Richard J. Hughes Justice Complex
- National Register of Historic Places listings in Somerset County, New Jersey
