= Swartout =

Swartout is a Dutch surname, a variant of Swarthout (literally, black wood). It may refer to the following notable people:

- David B. Swartout (born 1948), American golf instructor and coach
- Norman Lee Swartout (1879–1930), American playwright
- Hunt-Swartout raid, a 1756 massacre against colonial settlers in New Jersey, named after Anthony Swartwout, an American settler
