= Swarthout =

Swarthout, also spelled Swartwout and Swartout, is a surname of Dutch origins. All are descendants from the same lineage.

Notable people with the surname include:

- Gladys Swarthout (1900–1969), American opera singer
- Glendon Swarthout (1918–1992), American author
- Cornelius Swartwout, holder of first patent for the waffle iron
- David Swartout, golf instructor and coach
- Egerton Swartwout, American architect, Tracy and Swartwout
- Jacobus Swartwout (1734–1827), brigadier general in Revolutionary War, delegate to New York State US Federal Constitution ratification
- Roeloff Swartwout, early American settler, founder of Ulster County, New York
- Robert Swartwout, 9th quartermaster general of the US Army, brigadier general during War of 1812, merchant
- Samuel Swartwout, close supporter of Andrew Jackson, Collector of Customs Port of New York, American soldier
- Thomas Samuel Swartwout, early settler and landowner of Peenpack Wagheckemeck Patent, Mamakating precinct, Ulster County, New York precursor of the Town of Deerpark in Orange County, New York
- Tomys Swartwout, early American settler, founder of Midwood, Brooklyn, New York
