= Richard Hunt =

Richard Hunt may refer to:

== Arts and entertainment ==
- Richard Hunt (artist) (born 1951), Canadian carver and artist
- Richard Hunt (pianist) (1930–2011), Canadian pianist and composer
- Richard Hunt (sculptor) (1935–2023), American sculptor
- Richard Howland Hunt (1862–1931), American architect and son of Richard Morris Hunt
- Richard Morris Hunt (1827–1895), American architect
- Richard Hunt (puppeteer) (1951–1992), American puppeteer who performed a number of the Muppets

== Politics ==
- Richard Hunt (Nova Scotia politician) (1832–1915), politician in Nova Scotia, Canada
- Richard Hunt (MP), MP for Orford beginning in 1529
- Richard Harte or Hunt (died 1616), MP for Nottingham

== Sport ==
- Richard Hunt (rugby union) (born 1948), New Zealand rugby player, coach and administrator
- Dick Hunt (baseball) (1847–1895), American baseball player
- Dick Hunt (speed skater) (born 1935), American speed skater

== Other ==
- Richard Allen Hunt (1937–2009), American mathematician
- Sir Tim Hunt (Richard Timothy Hunt, born 1943), English biochemist
- Richard William Hunt (1908–1979), English editor, medieval historian, palaeographer
- Richard Hunt (editor) (1933–2012), English editor of environmentalist magazines Green Anarchist and Alternative Green
- Richard Hunt (priest) (1596–1661), English clergy indirectly associated with Shakespeare authorship dispute
- Richard Hunt (Dean of Durham) (died 1638), English clergy, Dean of Durham 1620–1638
- Richard W. Hunt (born c. 1952), U.S. Navy admiral
- Richard Hunt, American colonial militia officer targeted by Hunt-Swartout raid (1756) during French and Indian War

== See also ==
- Richard Hunter (disambiguation)
