= David B. Swartout =

American golf instructor & coach (born 1948)

David Swartout (born June 12, 1948) is an American golf instructor and coach, and former educator/administrator of Jackson Lumen Christi High School in Jackson, Michigan. In 2013, he became one of the winningest high school coaches in history. He was given the 2013 National Golf Coach of the Year award by the National High School Athletic Coaches Association, having been previously nominated in 1986 and 1992 for the award.

== Early life and family history ==
He was born in Petoskey, Michigan, raised in Jackson, Michigan, and is a 7th generation Michigander. His paternal many time great grandfather buried in Jackson County, Michigan, Thomas Swartout, served as Military guard in the New York Company of Rangers for the Continental Congress in 1776, during the drafting of the Declaration of Independence. His ancestors arrived in the colonies in 1652 and include early American landowners, advocates for democratic rights, and close allies of many Founding Fathers; Tomys Swartwout, Roeloff Swartwout, Thomas Maas Samuel Swartwout and Jacobus Swartwout.

== Coaching career ==
Swartout began teaching at Jackson Lumen Christi High School two years after it opened, in 1970, and started his golf coaching career in 1972. Since he began coaching, his teams have won 16 boys' state golf championships and two girls' state golf championships, and six of his teams have been state championship runner-up. His teams have qualified for the State Championships in 44 of the 56 seasons he has coached. He has been inducted into the Jackson, Michigan Golf Hall of Fame, Michigan Golf Coaches Association Hall of Fame, Michigan Coaches Hall of Fame, and Jackson Lumen Christi High School Hall of Fame. He was the MIGCA Coach of the Year in 1978, 1983, 1984, 1990, 1993, and 2009. He was National High School Athletic Coaches Association national finalist in 1993 and National Golf Coach of the Year in 2013. His dual meet record winning percentage is 90% (354-38) with 13 undefeated seasons.

== 2014 congressional election ==
On June 24, 2013, Swartout announced his candidacy to run for the United States Congress, as an independent in Michigan's 7th congressional district. He stated, "I want to make Congress work for residents of my hometown and for the entire nation. I want to bring back the vision of our Founding Fathers; to prove that compromise and good governance are actually possible in Washington D.C., your elected representatives should work for you - not special interests, not big money and not high-powered elites. To make sure I can do that - to be free of the chains that bind Congress - I am running as an Independent." Swartout was the first ever Independent candidate to be certified by the Michigan Election Commission to appear on the 7th Congressional District general election ballot.

== Swartout v. Johnson ==
On July 11, 2014 Swartout filed a complaint in the United States Federal District Court for the Eastern District of Michigan against Ruth Johnson in her official capacity as Secretary of State of Michigan. He challenged a provision of Michigan Election Law which requires that candidates for Congressional office who are Independents have the designation "NPA" or "no party affiliation" after their name on the general election ballots, creating ambiguity of their status. Swartout challenged that the inability to have "Independent" by his name, similar to the majority of American states, violated his First and Fourteenth Amendments of the U.S. Constitution. He cited Rosen v. Brown and Jenness v. Fortson as both binding and persuasive authority regarding similar ballot access cases.

On August 22, 2014 Senior Federal District Court Judge Bernard Friedman denied the Michigan Attorney General's office request for dismissal. Judge Friedman denied the motion on the grounds that "plaintiff has submitted a viable claim".

A hearing was set for September 24, 2014 at the federal courthouse in Detroit to hear arguments on issuance of a temporary restraining order to require the State of Michigan to reprint general election ballots. Judge Friedman turned down the requested order on the grounds that the motion was barred by laches, to not disrupt the orderly election process; he did not rule on the merits of the case. Judge Friedman further stated that "there seemed to be an issue here" and that maybe this was an issue "that state lawmakers should take up" to resolve.

On October 1, 2014, Swartout and the Michigan Attorney General's office both agreed to stipulate to a voluntary dismissal of the complaint, to allow the matter to be taken up at a later date by the Michigan State Legislature.
