= History of Sussex County, New Jersey =

The history of Sussex County, New Jersey spans over 13,000 years from the time Paleo Indians arrived after the Wisconsin glacier melted to the present day, and the entire width of the American experience.

Before Europeans arrived, the area was a wilderness with large areas of forests and grasslands inhabited by bands of Munsee, a subgroup within the Lenape, or Delaware Indians. The Netherlands claimed the area in the early 1600s, although the area was never settled when the Netherlands had control of the area. First settled by Dutch colonists from the New Netherland Colony in the early 1700s, after the area came under English control. Sussex County later welcomed Palatine Germans who journeyed north from Philadelphia, Dutch from New York, and other British settlers in the eighteenth century.

== Paleo Indians ==
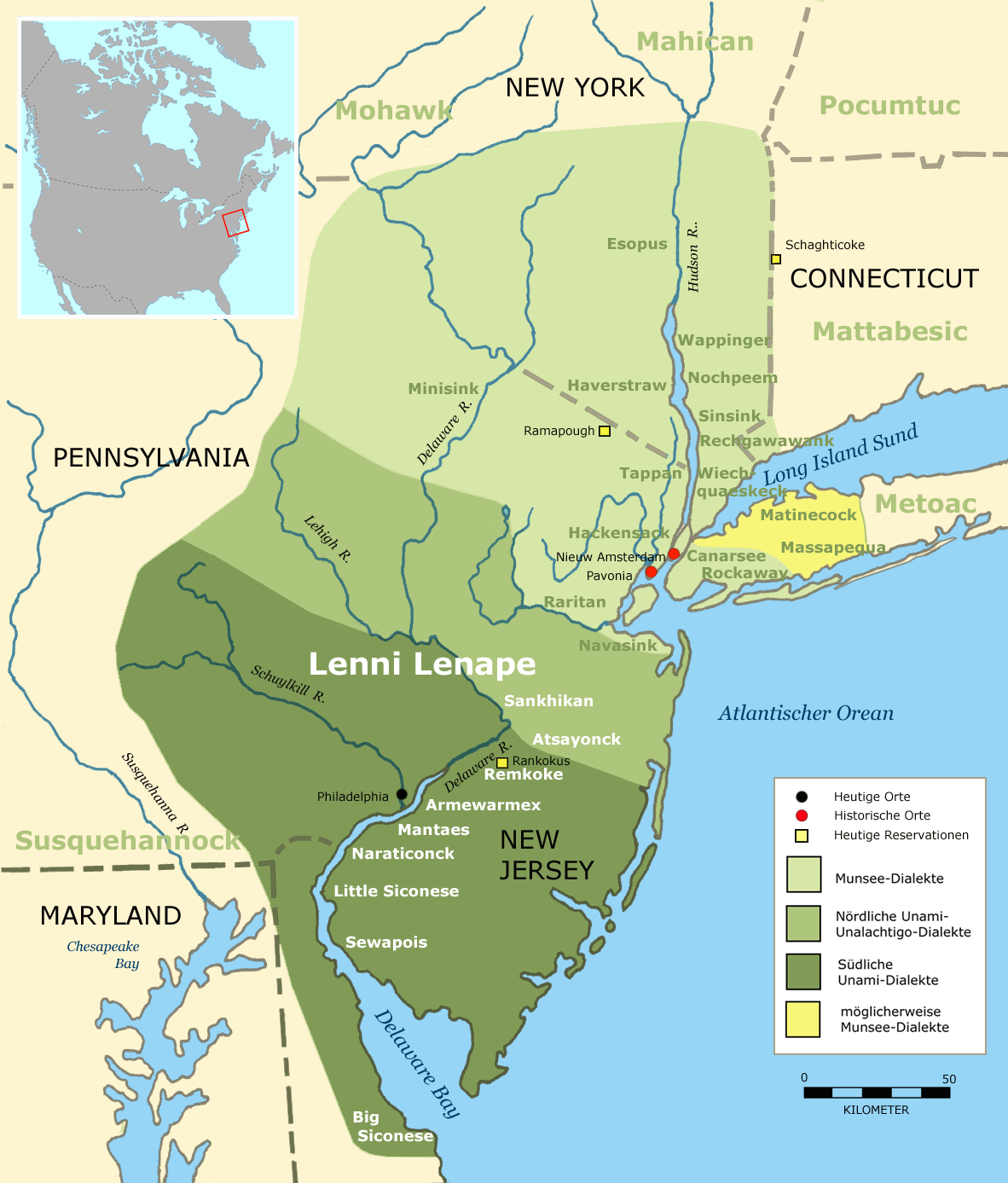
Map showing the aboriginal boundaries of Lenape territories, with Munsee territory the lightly shaded northernmost area, and Unami to the south

The area now known as Sussex county, was first occupied by Paleo Indians as the Wisconsin glacier melted 16,000 B.C. The entire county was covered in ice, hundreds of feet thick for thousands of years. After the Wisconsin Glacier melted around 16,000 B.C., the area slowly warmed, but was still cold and wet. Paleo Indians are estimated to have moved into the area around 11,000 B.C. and lived in small groups that traveled in search of game and plants to eat. They also ate fresh water clams and fish that migrated north in the Delaware River to spawn. Fish were caught by spears or fish traps made of stones and sticks.

Mastodons roamed the area during the Paleo Indian era. It is unknown if Paleo Indians hunted this mega fauna.

As climate warmed further around 3,000 B.C. nut producing trees supported Archaic Indian population growth. Some Paleo Indians moved north with the caribou and musk ox.

Around 1000 B.C. clay pottery was beginning to be used. This was the beginning of the Woodland Period. With this advancement in technology.

Technological innovations occurred around the year 500 A. D. with the invention of the bow and arrow; as projectile points became smaller to fit onto an arrow shaft. Now Native Americans could procure more food as they could be further away from game to kill it. The adlatls were still being used.

Various cultures of indigenous peoples occupied the area at that time.

There are 25 rock shelters in Sussex County. ( NJGS Schrabisch 1915). Early hunters established places to live near water sources and food supply.

== Lenape Native Americans ==
At the time of European encounter, the historic Lenape (/ˈlɛnəpiː/ or /ləˈnɑːpi/), a Native American people, also called Delaware Indians after their historic territory along the Delaware River, inhabited the mid-Atlantic coastal areas and inland along the Hudson and Delaware rivers.

The Lenape claim that they came from the Mississippi River area around the year 1000. Their villages were along the Delaware River and along other river drainages that went into the Delaware or other rivers.

Problems developed in the early 17th century when the Little Ice Age came to North America. With late frost in May or June and early frosts in August or September; made the growing of corn, beans and squash difficult. Cold weather also made big and small game more difficult to find, as game went into semi hibernation. Also nut crops from oak, hickory, beech, walnut, chestnut, and butternut failed at times; making the supply of these nuts scarce for food. Rivers froze early so fishing became impossible. Native American populations declined after epidemics of infectious diseases, for which they had no acquired immunity. Native American populations were separated from Europe for thousands of years and had no immunity to the diseases the Europeans brought with them. Many Native American populations were weakened from starvation due to the Little Ice Age, which was coldest during the 17th century. Their important corn, bean and squash crops failed due to late cold weather and early frosts. As the Native American population declined due to disease, starvation, or killing of Native Americans; more land was available for European settlement. Land was also purchased either fairly or by deception. All these factors made the Native populations decline dramatically. After 1750, very few Native Americans were left in Sussex County. The Treaty of Easton in 1758, forced what little Native Americans remained in New Jersey to move west to the Mississippi River drainage or north to Ontario or Quebec Canada.

== European Settlement ==
Henry Hudson working for the Dutch East India Company explored eastern North America during the summer of 1609. Due to Hudson's voyage, the Dutch claimed all land between the 40th and 45th latitude. This was from Delaware Bay to Albany New York: including the area now known as Massachusetts, Connecticut, New Jersey, New York, and Rhode Island. The Dutch settled the Hudson River Valley and claimed all lands west of the Hudson River in the early 17th century. They traded with the Native Americans for furs, such as beaver, otter, muskrat, and deer. The Dutch built a fort at the southern end of Manhattan Island known as Fort Amsterdam. This was their main fort in North America. They also had other forts along the Hudson River up to Albany, New York including Fort Nassau.

In 1615, 3 men left Fort Nassau near Albany N.Y., traveled southwest to the Delaware River, then along the Delaware to where they were captured in 1616 by Native Americans near Schuylkill River and the Delaware River. This area is south of Easton, Pa. It is unknown the route that the 3 men traveled. They may have traveled through Sussex County or may have traveled though Pennsylvania. This is the earliest record of Europeans traveling near or in Sussex County.

The English took over the Fort Amsterdam in August 1664 and gain control of the land the Dutch claimed. There was a ten-year war that followed with England and the Netherlands, but the English won.

Since the English owned the Province of New Jersey, it was divided into two parts; East and West Jersey. The Quintipartite Deed of 1674 to 1702; divided the province of Jersey with two surveys. These surveys were the Keith Line and the other survey was the Coxe-Barclay line which created the border of eastern Sussex county. The Coxe-Barclay line which was drawn in the late 1600s, established West Jersey in what is now Sussex County from the headwaters of the Pequannock River with a line going northeast to the line of the Province of New jersey and New York. This line was between 41 degrees 40 minutes north to 41 degrees north. The western border was the Delaware River.

Dutch began to migrate southwest from the Hudson River area toward the Delaware River. As early as 1690, Dutch and French Huguenot colonists from New York began permanently settling in the Upper Delaware Valley (known as the "Minisink"). They settled the Port Jervis area, which at that time was Burlington County. Burlington County went as far north along the Delaware as 41 degrees and 40 minutes north, which is near Callicoon, New York. Later a Quaker meeting house was established in 1700 in Plains, near Papakating Creek.

At this time there was the twelve dominate hardwood species of trees of North America growing in Sussex County. These trees are Ash, Beech, Birch, Cherry Chestnut, Elm, Hickory, Sweetgum, Maple, Oak, Sycamore, and Walnut.

At this time, the county was populated by bands of Munsee-speaking Lenape; people who inhabited Northwestern New Jersey and Southern New York, including Long Island. They had also been in western Connecticut, but migrated into New Jersey by the early eighteenth century. Speakers of other dialects of Lenape inhabited areas further south into Delaware. Following Indian Trails from Esopus (now Kingston, New York), these Dutch and Huguenot families established settlements along the Rondout Creek, Neversink River and Mamakating Valley in Orange County, New York, and along the Delaware River in northwestern New Jersey and northeastern Pennsylvania. This Indian Trail led to the council fire of the Lenape tribes at Minisink, an island in the Delaware in present-day Montague Township. It would later become the route of the Old Mine Road and stretches of present-date U.S. Route 209.

Several amateur historians refer to a "company of Dutch miners" building the Old Mine Road and establishing a copper mine near the Delaware Water Gap circa 1640, citing it as the first European settlement in Sussex County. But, these stories are not supported by documentary or archaeological evidence. At this time, many adventurers (or coureurs des bois) from Sir Edmund Plowden's failed New Albion Colony and Dutch New Netherland are reputed to have sought mineral deposits (especially precious metals) and animal furs in the undefined wilderness and journeyed to trade with inland Indian tribes, but no evidence of their efforts remain.

Palatine German immigrants, refugees from religious wars and harsh winters, arrived in Philadelphia and New York City in 1709 and 1710, but generally had to work for several years in English camps to pay off their passage to the colonies. Some began settling river valleys in Northwestern New Jersey and Pennsylvania's Lehigh Valley in the 1720s, with more settlers added by additional German immigrants after 1740. In the 1740s and 1750s, Scottish settlers from Elizabethtown and Perth Amboy, and English settlers from these cities, Long Island, Connecticut and Massachusetts, came to New Jersey and moved up the tributaries of the Passaic and Raritan rivers. Some settled in the eastern sections of present-day Sussex and Warren counties.

After the French and Indian war there was a border dispute between the Province of New Jersey and New York. This was the New Jersey-New York line war. This boundary line was settled in 1769. So the northern border of Sussex County was established at the confluence of the Neversink River and Delaware River at Port Jervis, New York going on a southeast angle to the Hudson River. There is a stone in the Delaware River to mark the border where the three states meet.

== Organization of Sussex County ==
Sussex county was originally included in Burlington county when it was established in 1694. This was considered as part of West Jersey. This area now known as Sussex County was then part of Hunterdon County on March 11, 1714. When Morris County was created in 1739, Sussex County was then part of Morris County.

By the 1750s, residents of this area began to petition colonial authorities for a new county to be formed; they complained of the inconvenience of long travel to conduct business with the government and the courts. By this time, four large townships had been created in this sparsely populated Northwestern region: Walpack Township (before 1731), Greenwich Township (before 1738), Hardwick Township (1750) and Newtown Township (1751). On June 8, 1753, Sussex County was created from these four municipalities, which were a large portion of Morris County. Sussex County at this time encompassed present-day Sussex, Warren Counties and a part of present-day New York State. with the following legal boundaries:

That all and singular, the lands and upper parts of said Morris County northwest of Muskonetkong river, BEGINNING at the mouth of said river, where it empties itself into Delaware river, and running up said Muskonetkong river, to the head of the great pond; from thence to the line that divides the province of New-York and said New-Jersey; thence along the said line to Delaware river aforesaid; thence down the same to the mouth of Muskonetkong...

The county purportedly was named by Royal Governor Jonathan Belcher after the family seat of Thomas Pelham-Holles, 1st Duke of Newcastle (1693–1768), who at the time was the Secretary of State for the Northern Department, and later the prime minister of the United Kingdom (1754–1756, 1757–1762). The Duke of Newcastle and his brother Henry Pelham were both prominent political figures in England from 1710 to 1762, and their family's ancestral seat was in the County of Sussex in England.

In the early 19th century, southern residents sought to gain some court sessions in their part of the county, suggesting alternating locations—in Newton in the north and in either Oxford or Belvidere in the south. The state legislature eventually voted to divide Sussex County in two, using a line drawn from the juncture of the Flat Brook and Delaware River in a southeasterly direction to the Musconetcong River running through Yellow Frame in present-day Fredon Township (then part of Hardwick). On November 20, 1824, Warren County was created from the southern territory of the Sussex County.

== Sussex County in War ==
=== French and Indian War (1756–1763) ===
Shortly after the county was created, hostilities between the British and the French began to spill over from the European continent into the colonies in the New World. This was due to land claims by the English and French in western Pennsylvania and the Ohio River Valley area. The battle of Jumonville Glen was in southwestern Pennsylvania in late May 1754. This is near Unionville, Pa. George Washington ordered an attack on French and Canadians. Joseph de Jumonville was killed, a second ensign, an officer. This was the first battle of the French and Indian war which was started by George Washington. French colonists in North America armed several Native American tribes. The Native Americans sided with the French due to poor treatment by the British; unfair land purchases, and the Walking Purchase in eastern Pennsylvania of September 1737.

During the French and Indian War (as the Seven Years' War's hostilities in North America were called), Sussex County was often raided by bands of Native Americans, among them members of the Lenape, Shawnee, and Iroquois who fought against white settlers. In 1756, a small band of Lenape raided the homes of local militia commanders, killing several members of the Swartout family and kidnapping other settlers during the Hunt-Swartout Raid. In response to these aggressions, Royal Governor Jonathan Belcher approved a plan for 8 forts to be constructed along the Delaware River to defend the New Jersey frontier from such incursions, and authorized the New Jersey Frontier Guard to man them. Several of these forts were little more than blockhouses, others were personal homes that were fortified. These forts went from Phillipsburg northward to Belvidere in Warren County. Then north of Blairstown to Van Campen's Inn. Then north along the eastern side of the Delaware River to Port Jervis, New York. The first fort was called Fort Reading. This fort was near the Pequest River on the south side of the river near the Belvidere-Riverton Bridge. This fort was built in 1757. The second fort was Ellison's Fort built of stone in Knowlton Township. This fort is located at the Delaware River Family Campground. The trail went through the Kittatinny Mountains north of Blairstown to Colonel Isaac Van Campen's Inn 1742, about 18 miles northeast of Fort Reading. This fort is located in Walpack Township. Fort John also called Headquarters Fort was up a hill near Van Campens Fort. The next fortification was Fort Walpack build six miles north of Van Campens Fort in the bow of Walpack Bend around 1756. This is in Walpack Township. About six miles north of Walpack Fort is Fort Nominack 1756, which is located just north of Jager Road and Old Mine Road in Sandyston Township. The next fort was Fort Shipeconk 1757 located 4 miles north of the previous fort. A fortified house owned by Captain Abraham Shimer was very close to Fort Shipeconk. Further north the next fortified house was maintained west of Port Jervis, New York and it was called Fort Cole. After Fort Cole there was Fort Gardner which was located north of Port Jervis below the Great Mountain

Most of the hostilities were ended with the signing of the Treaty of Easton in 1758 brokered a peace between the colonial government and the Lenape and created the first American Indian Reservation, Brotherton, in present-day Evesham Township, New Jersey. The war finally ended with the signing of the Treaty of Paris on 10 February 1763.

As a result of disruption following the French and Indian War (1756–1763) the American Revolutionary War (1775–1783) and later Indian removals from the eastern United States, the main groups now live in Ontario (Canada), and Wisconsin and Oklahoma in the United States. In Canada, they are enrolled in the Munsee-Delaware Nation, the Moravian of the Thames First Nation, and the Delaware of Six Nations. In the United States, they are enrolled in three federally recognized tribes, the Delaware Nation and the Delaware Tribe of Indians located in Oklahoma, and the Stockbridge-Munsee Community, located in Wisconsin. The non-federally recognized Ramapough Mountain Indians and the Nanticoke Lenni-Lenape Tribal Nation, recognized as tribes by the state of New Jersey, identify as Lenape descendants.

=== American Revolution (1775–1783) ===
During the American Revolution, loyalist Lieutenant James Moody lead a daring raid against the county's court house (which housed the county jail in its basement). In 1780, Moody led several men to free eight Loyalist prisoners held in the Sussex County Courthouse. Moody freed the men and fled with them. Despite a pursuit lasting several days, Revolutionary forces failed to capture them.

== Dairy Farming and Agriculture ==
Early settlers established farms whose operations were chiefly focused towards subsistence agriculture. Because of geological constraints, Sussex County's agricultural production was centered around dairy farming. A few farms had orchards—typically apples and peaches. A typical farmer produced enough food to feed their families and perhaps sell or exchange the remaining food and products with their neighbors. Excess fruit and grain were turned into alcoholic beverages. This was the economic model until the mid-19th century when advances in food preservation and the introduction of railroads into the area allowed Sussex County to transport farm products throughout the region.

In 1914, Montclair stockbroker James Turner invested $500,000 to develop Lusscroft Farm in a 578-acre property in Wantage Township. He sought to create a perfect model for dairy farming and to promote scientific research to improve production and efficiency within the industry. In 1931, Turner donated the farm property (then 1,050 acres in total), cattle and operations to the State of New Jersey to be used as an agricultural research station. Cook College, the agriculture and environmental science residential college at Rutgers University used the property for active research in animal husbandry, horticulture and forestry until 1970 and Rutgers finally closed the facility in 1996. Research conducted at Lusscroft Farm led to the development of new techniques in grassland farming, ensilage, livestock breeding (the creation of artificial insemination techniques for dairy cows) and production testing for a safe milk supply. Today, the property is part of High Point State Park and operated by the Sussex County Heritage and Agriculture Association, a local non-profit organization, under a memorandum of understanding with the New Jersey Department of Environmental Protection. It is open to the public as an agricultural heritage center focused on agricultural education, outdoor recreation, and historical interpretation.

== Iron mining ==
The Highlands Region of Northwestern New Jersey has proven to possess rich deposits of iron ore. In the mid 18th century, several entrepreneurial colonists began mining iron in present-day Sussex County and establishing forges and furnaces to create pig iron and bar iron. By the end of the 18th century, almost all of the trees in Sussex County were cut to provide charcoal to fuel the forges and furnaces in iron production.

In 1749, William Allen and Joseph Turner of Philadelphia acquired 21,363 acres (8,645 ha; 33.380 sq mi) of land in northwestern New Jersey for 3,000 British pounds, which included “well known Andover mine and the village of Andover with its forges and furnaces”. This forge, known as "Old Andover," was located at present-day Waterloo in Byram Township. In 1760, Allen and Turner built a blast furnace and forge on a branch of the Pequest River in present-day Andover Borough. Both owners remained loyal to the British Crown during the American Revolution.

In 1777, the Quartermaster Department of the Continental Army complained to Congress of difficulties in acquiring iron to support the war effort. After trying to procure iron from Allen and Turner and being rebuffed, the Continental Congress's ordered Colonel Benjamin Flower and Colonel Thomas Maybury to take possession of the Iron Works in order to equip General Washington's army.

This mine lay idle from 1800 to 1848, when the firm Cooper & Hewitt acquired the works for $2,500. It went on to produce 50,000 tons of iron ore each year. The firm manufactured railroad rails and the country's first structural steel, which and led to the building of railroads and commercial development in the county.

Iron from the Andover mines was fashioned into cable wire for the bridge built at Niagara Falls and for the beams used to rebuild Princeton University's Nassau Hall in Princeton, New Jersey after a fire undermined the structure in 1855. During the American Civil War, Andover iron found its way into rifle barrels and cannonballs just as it had during the Revolution years before. According to local tradition, Andover Forge forged the Great Chains used at West Point to keep British naval vessels from coming up the Hudson River during the Revolution, but other sources say the chains were forged in Orange County, New York.

A revolutionary era iron mine and smelter later became Picatinny Arsenal's location. Several revolutionary era lead mines were operated in Sussex county.

In the 1870s, the prolific American inventor Thomas Edison began to explore the commercial opportunities of processing poor-quality low-grade iron ore to combat the growing scarcity of iron deposits in the United States. He developed a process of crushing and milling iron-bearing minerals and separating iron ore from the material through large electromagnets. After experimenting at a plant in Bechtelsville, Pennsylvania, Edison built one of the world's largest ore-crushing mills near Ogdensburg, New Jersey. Completed in 1889, the factory contained three giant electromagnets and was intended to process up to 1200 tons of iron ore every day. However, technical difficulties repeatedly thwarted production. At the outset, Edison had high hopes that he would "do something now so different and so much bigger than anything I've ever done before people will forget that my name ever was connected with anything electrical." However, in the 1890s, richer soft-grade iron ore deposits located in Minnesota rendered Edison's Ogdensburg operation unprofitable and he closed the works in 1900. Edison adapted the process and machinery for the cement industry and invested in producing Portland Cement.

== Zinc mines and fluorescent minerals ==
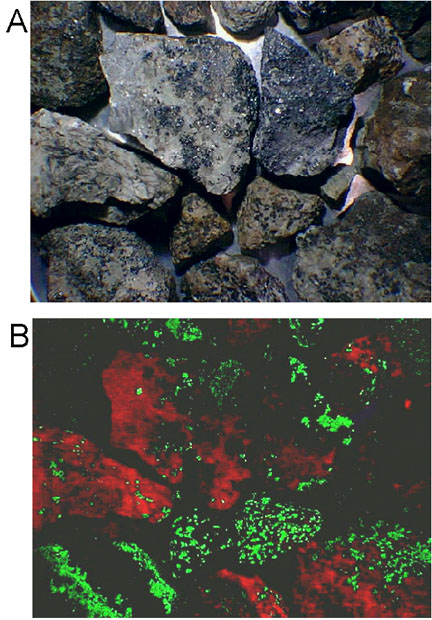
Fluorescent minerals of the Franklin mineral district: franklinite (black), willemite (green), and calcite (red). USGS

After completing medical school in Philadelphia, Samuel Fowler (1779–1844) settled in Franklin, New Jersey to open up a medical practice, but is largely known for his interest in mineralogy which led to his developing commercial uses for zinc and for discovery of several rare minerals (chiefly various ores of zinc) that are known for fluorescing in vivid colors when exposed to ultraviolet light. Franklin is known as the "Fluorescent Mineral Capital of the World." Fowler, who later served in the New Jersey State Senate and U.S. House of Representatives, purchased and operated an iron works in the village (which he named Franklin Furnace) and bought several abandoned zinc and iron mines in the area.

Shortly after his death, two companies were created to exploit the iron and zinc deposits in this region; they acquired the rights to Fowler's holdings in Franklin and nearby Sterling Hill. The Sussex Zinc and Copper Mining and Manufacturing Corporation was incorporated in 1848 for the purpose of mining zinc, and the New Jersey Exploration and Mining Company was incorporated in 1849 to extract iron. With the same founding partners, in 1852 the companies merged to form the New Jersey Zinc Corporation (today known as Horsehead Industries). Because of ambiguous deeds, overlapping claims, and misunderstanding over the nature of the ores at Franklin and Sterling Hill, mining companies in the district were in constant litigation. From 1868 to 1880, the New Jersey Zinc Company fought a legal battle with Moses Taylor's Franklin Iron Company, a dispute that was finally resolved in 1880 by merging the two companies into the New Jersey Zinc and Iron Company. In 1897, the remaining Franklin District companies were consolidated under the umbrella of the New Jersey Zinc Company, and managed by Stephen S. Palmer. At this time, Russian, British, Irish, Hungarian and Polish immigrants came to Franklin to work in the mines, and the population of Franklin swelled from 500 (in 1897) to over 3,000 (in 1913).

The Palmer family controlled the company for 46 years until the death of Stephen's son, Edgar Palmer, in 1943. In order to pay inheritance taxes, his estate was forced to sell its controlling interest in the company. Declining deposits in the Franklin area, the expense of pumping groundwater from mine shafts, and misdirected investments by the company led to the abandonment of the mines by the 1970s. Today, both the Franklin and Sterling Hill mines are operated as museums.

== Railroads ==
During the 1980s, I assisted with clearing the Paulinskill Valley Trail from Sparta Junction to Columbia Lake near Route 80. AS a volunteer with the NJ Forest Fire Service I helped others to do this during the winter months. As can be imagined the railroad bed was heavily overgown and demanded a lot of hand labor to clear. Along the way were found many railroad artifacts from long ago. Old switch plates, Railroad mileage posts, Culverts, spikes and occasionally other articles. As we worked along the way I also located the remains of Station foundations and old Creamery buildings, foundations for water tanks and old Semaphore battery boxes. Finding several paperback books on Railroads I used these to return along the track bed where some 1905 photographs of stations had been and using the photos I determined where the photographer on the Special train assigned to him had taken the old black & white photos. It was an interesting adventure and one which I later documented with my own photos I took. Now, many years later I still think of those adventurous days along the old Railroad lines of Sussex County and of an era long ago- gone. (Bob Spear; Historian, Forest Fire Lookout Association FFLA.ORG, October 2016

Railroad routes in Sussex County

As of 2012, a freight line running in Hardyston and Sparta townships is the only railroad operating in Sussex County. However, in the past, several railroad companies operated lines in the county when the county's dairy and mining industries relied on trains in their commerce. With the decline of those industries, the end of transporting the mail by train, refrigeration in trucks, lower freight and fuel costs by trucking, the railroads began to lose business; they ceased operating in the 1960s and 1970s. Today, many of the abandoned railbeds have been transformed into recreational trails. With New Jersey Transit's reconstruction and scheduled 2014 reopening of the Lackawanna Cut-Off, passenger rail service will return to Sussex County for the first time in almost fifty years.

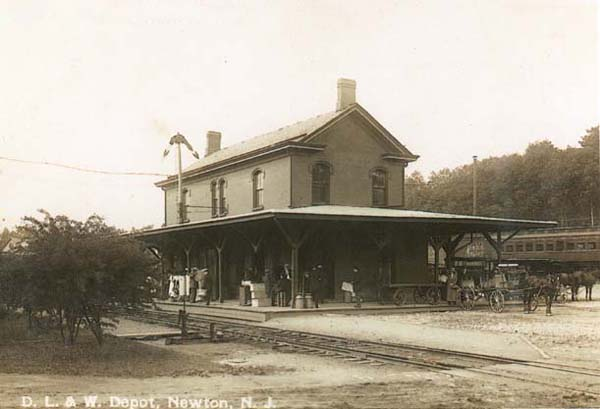
Newton Station (built 1873) was one of the first station sites in the system.

With the reopening of the Andover iron mines, the Sussex Railroad was chartered in 1848 to transport iron ore and products to the Morris Canal. Construction of the line began in 1853 and the connection was completed to Newton at the end of the following year. The line was extended to Branchville and Lafayette (1866–1869), Franklin in 1871 (to provide service to the zinc mines). This was the first railroad company to establish service in Sussex County and it played a role in the economic development of the dairy and mining industry in the area. The Sussex Railroad operated until 1945 when the line merged with the Delaware, Lackawanna and Western Railroad system. The last train travelled the route on October 2, 1966 and the tracks were soon removed. Today, the right-of-way has been converted into a recreational rail trail called the Sussex Branch Trail.

From 1886 to 1962, the New York, Susquehanna and Western Railway and Blairstown Railway operated a branch that followed the valley of the Paulins Kill. This railway's principal business was in the transport of coal from Northeastern Pennsylvania to New York City. In the late 1980s, the State of New Jersey purchased the abandoned railbed and transformed into a recreational trail. The Paulinskill Valley Trail is a 27-mile scenic trail system that is used for hiking, cycling, jogging and horseback riding. Motor vehicles and all-terrain vehicles are not permitted.

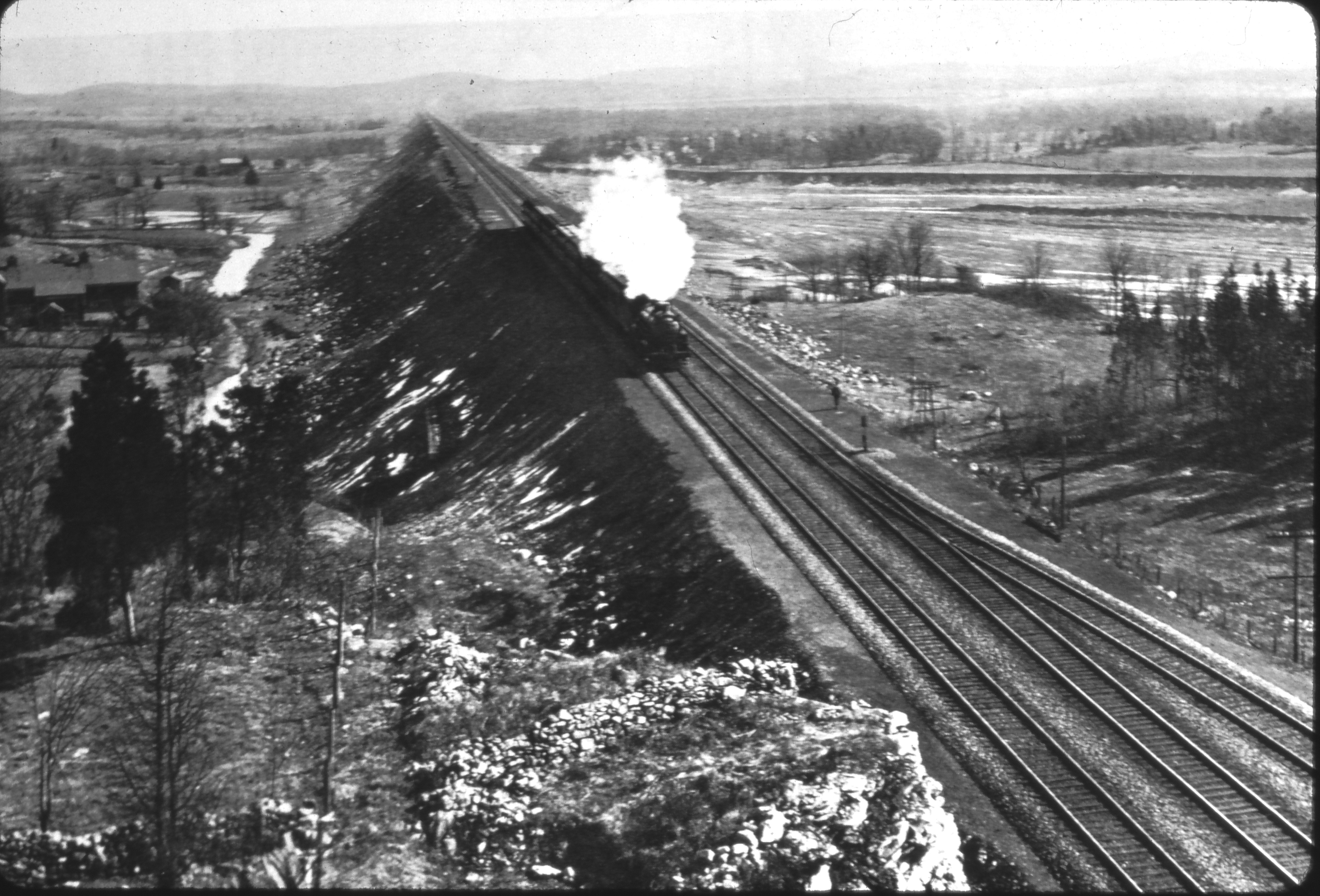
The westbound Lackawanna Limited travelling through the Pequest Fill in Sussex County, c. 1912

At the beginning of the 20th century, the Delaware, Lackawanna and Western Railroad opened a 400-mile (645 km) mainline that ran from Hoboken, New Jersey, to Buffalo, New York. A segment of this line called the Lackawanna Cut-Off (also known as the New Jersey Cut-Off, the Hopatcong-Slateford Cut-Off, the Lackawanna Highline, or simply the Cut-Off) was built across the southern portion of Sussex County from 1908 to 1911. It was in operation until 1979 and abandoned four years later. This route is being rebuilt and is scheduled to begin operating in 2014 under the management of New Jersey Transit. The Cut-Off ran west from Port Morris Junction—near the southern tip of Lake Hopatcong in New Jersey, about 45 miles (72.4 km) west-northwest of New York City – to Slateford Junction near the Delaware Water Gap in Pennsylvania, a total of 28.45 miles (45.9 km). The Lackawanna Cut-Off is an example of early 20th-century right-of-way construction, which minimized grades and curves and was built without vehicular crossings. It was one of the first railroad projects to use reinforced concrete on a large scale.
