= Jacobus Swartwout =

American politician

Brigadier General Jacobus Swartwout
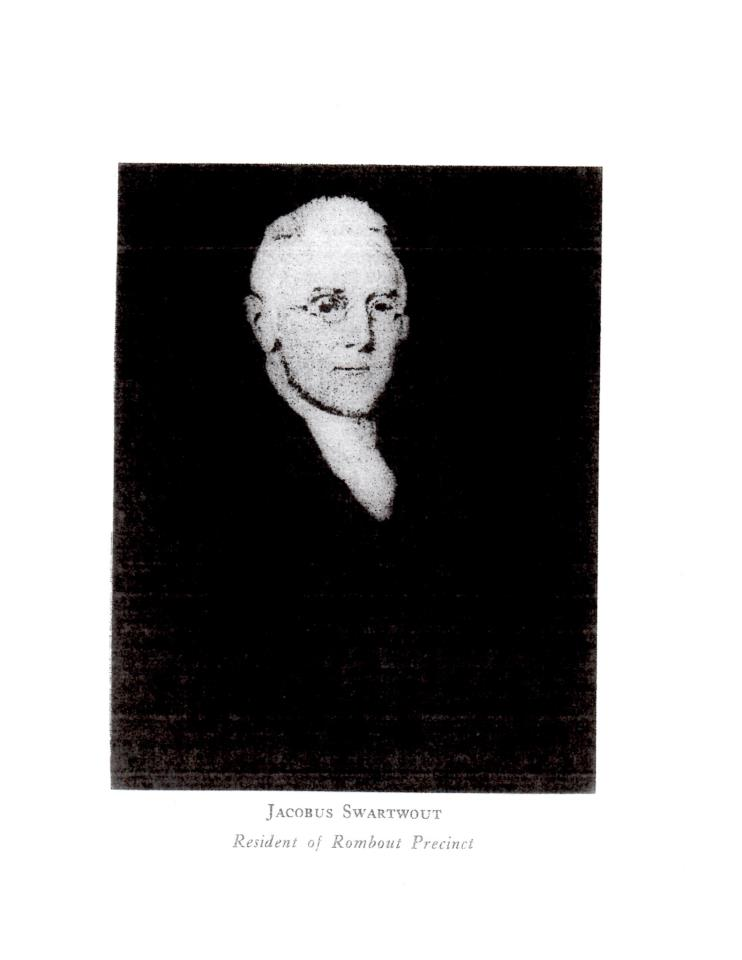
- Born: November 5, 1734; Wiccopee, Fishkill, Dutchess County, New York
- Died: February 16, 1827 (aged 92); Swartwoutville, Wappinger, Dutchess County, New York

Jacobus Swartwout (1734–1827) was an early American landowner, statesman, and military leader. Swartwout served as a brigadier general in the Continental Army during the American Revolutionary War under General George Washington. He was a close ally of many key Founding Fathers of the United States, and a delegate to New York State's convention for ratification of the US Constitution.

== Family and life ==
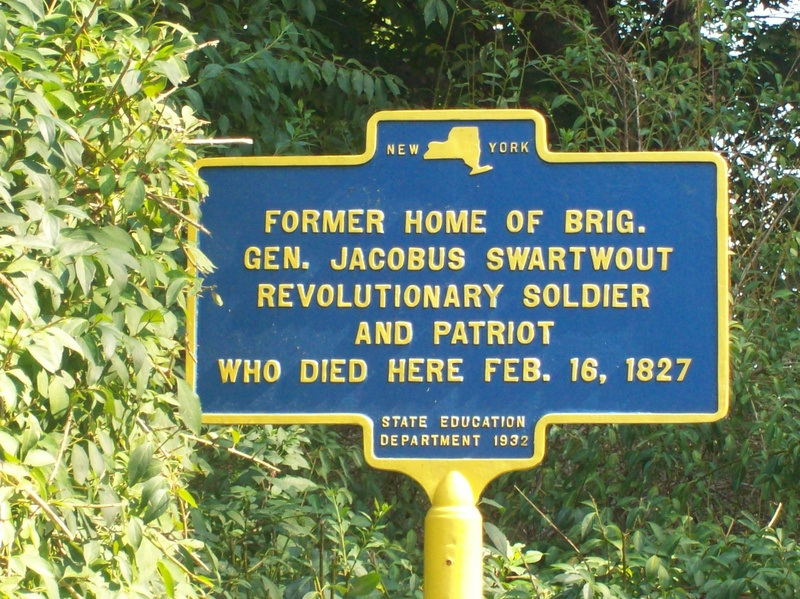
General Swartwout homestead near Fishkill

Jacobus Swartwout was born in Wiccopee, New York, on November 5, 1734, the son of Captain Jacobus Swartwout (1692–1749) and Gieletjen Nieuwkerk (1691–1749). He was baptized at the Fishkill Dutch Reformed Church. He was the grandson of Thomas Samuel Swartwout, the great grandson of Roeloff Swartwout and the great great grandson of Tomys Swartwout. His father married Gieletjen "Jannetie" Nieuwkerk of Kingston, Ulster County, New York on October 5, 1714, in Old Dutch Church in Kingston. In 1721, his father purchased 306 acres of land from Catheryna Brett. The farm was situated south of the Fishkill Creek, about nine miles from the Hudson River, in an area known as Wiccopee.

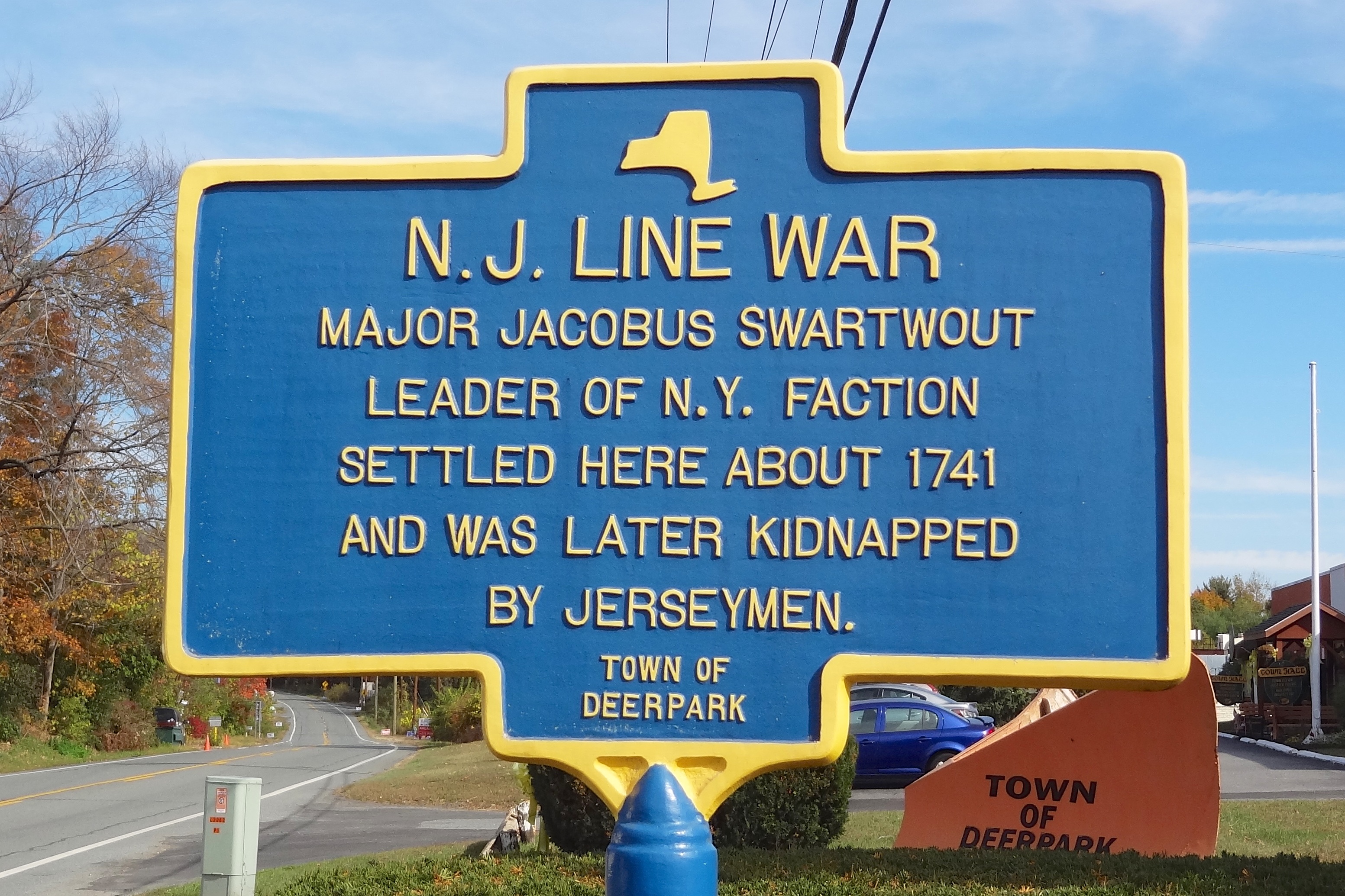
Major Swartwout homestead near Port Jervis

His father's cousin, Major Jacobus Swartwout (1696–1756), was the son of Antoni Swartwout (1664–1700) and the grandson of Roeloff Swartwout. He owned land at Waghaghkemeck (north of Port Jervis, Orange County, present day Huguenot, Town of Deerpark), and was a major in the light foot militia of Orange County under Col. Vincent Matthews from the 1730s to 1760. He died on February 16, 1827.

== Military career ==
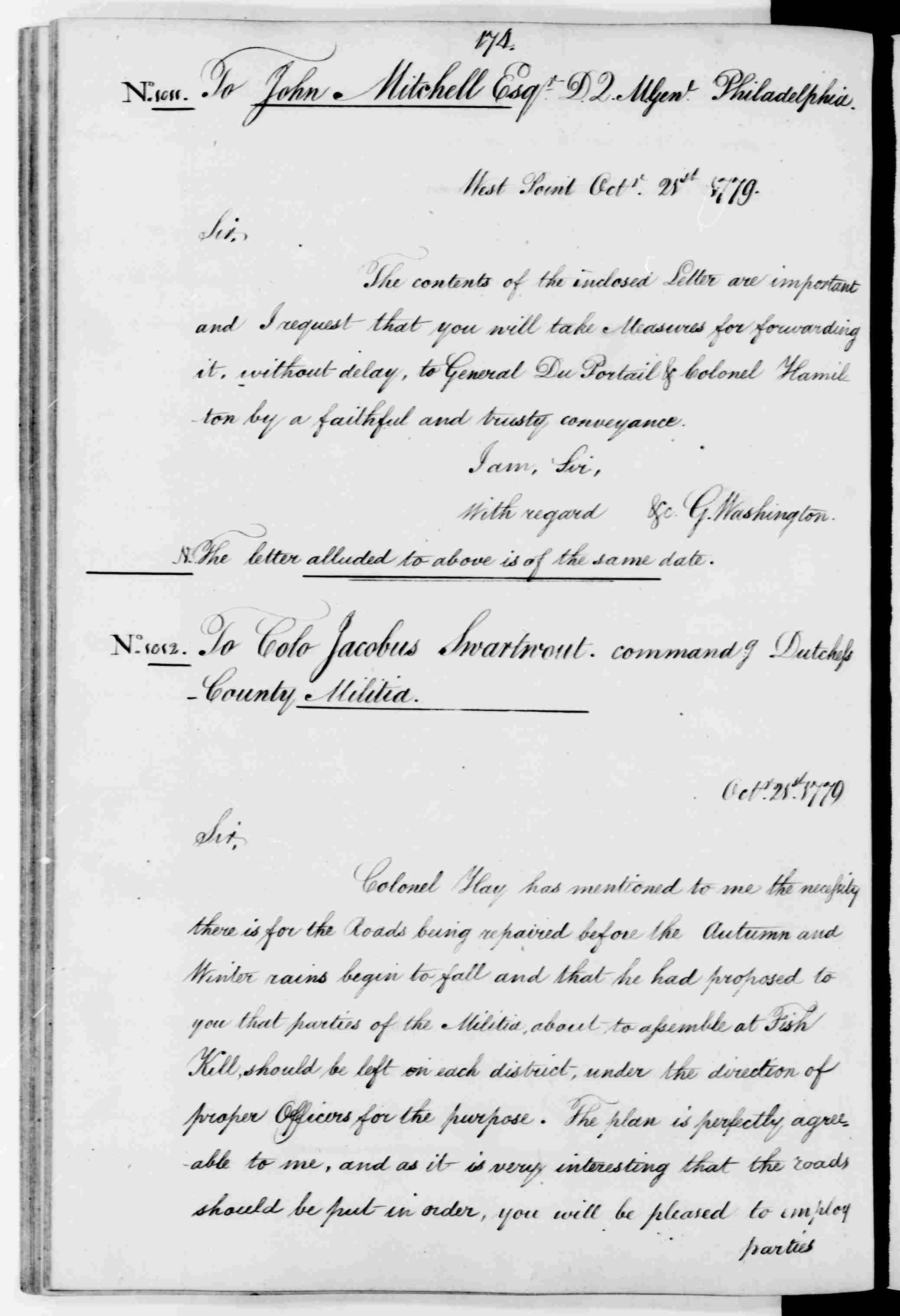
General George Washington to Colonel Swartwout from West Point, October 1779

=== French and Indian War ===
Swartwout continued the tradition of family military service when, 21 days after his wedding to Aeltje in 1759, he was appointed captain of a company of Dutchess County volunteers. He began his military training under Lord Jeffrey Amherst at Fort Ticonderoga and Crown Point.

== First American Intelligence Service ==
The first organization under the Articles of Confederation created for counterintelligence purposes was the Committee for Detecting and Defeating Conspiracies, later the Commission. It was made up of a board established in New York between June 1776 and January 1778 to collect intelligence, apprehend British spies and couriers, and examine suspected British sympathizers. In effect, it was created as "secret service" which had the power to arrest, to convict, to grant bail or parole, and to imprison or to deport. A company of militia was placed under its command, of which Jacobous Swartwout was in command. The Committee heard over 500 cases involving disloyalty and subversion. The Committee changed to a Commission by Continental Congress in February 1777 and moved to Kingston. The board consisted of Egbert Benson, Melancton Smith and Jacobus Swartwout, with John Jay remaining as chairman.

=== American Revolution ===
In September 1774, colonial representatives in Philadelphia called for the establishment of a Committee of Observation in each county. Swartwout was named the Deputy Chairman of the Fishkill local Committee.

On July 8, 1775, Captain Swartwout was appointed muster-master of four companies to be raised. Twenty-nine members of the Swartwout family served in the war of American independence, two having the rank of brigadier-general, three that of captain, three of lieutenant, and four of ensign. He was made Colonel 1st Regiment Dutchess County New York Militia 1776 as well as Colonel of Charlotte County New York Militia June 25, 1778, as part of Governor George Clinton's Brigade. He was later promoted to Brigadier-General Dutchess County New York Militia, March 3, 1780.

The Dutchess County militia or "Swartwout Regiment" was part of Governor Clinton's Brigade and William Heath's Division during the Battle of Long Island. In the writings of General George Washington's manuscripts, Swartwout's regiment left Kings Bridge 18 October 1776, to fight in the Battle of White Plains. The regiment was about 364 men strong and were in service at Fort Washington, Fort Independence, the Battle of Long Island, Kings Bridge, the Battle of White Plains, the defense of New York levies as well as other engagements through the end of the war on the Northern front. Swartwout resigned on October 3, 1794, and promoted Abraham Brinkerhoff to the post for Dutchess County.

== Swartwoutville and the American Revolution ==
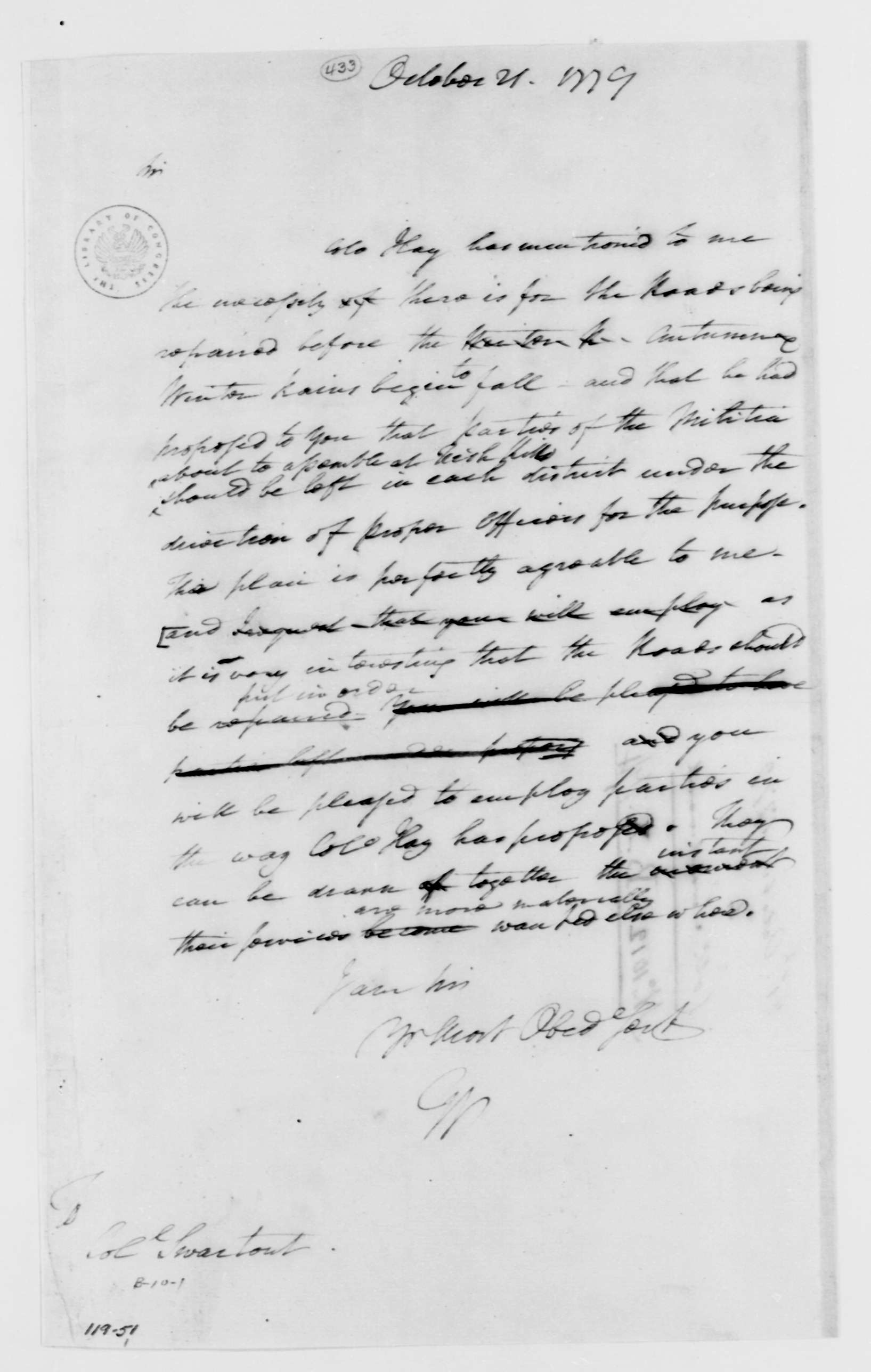
General George Washington to Colonel Swartwout, Library of Congress

In 1760, Swartwout purchased 3,000 acres of land from Madam Brett and built his first home after his wedding to Aaltje Brinkerhoff, of Brinkerhoff, New York. The Swartwoutville Hamlet is located in the south east corner of the town of Wappinger, New York.

General George Washington was staying in Fishkill in October 1778. The headquarters of the commander-in-chief was then in the home of Captain John Brinkerhoff father-in-law to Jacobus Swartwout, in a low stone home about midway on the highway between the settlement of Brinkerhoff and Swartwoutville. During this period Prussian-American General, Baron Frederick William Augustus de Steuben, had his headquarters at the neighboring homestead of Colonel Jacobus Swartwout, standing immediately south of his later residence at Swartwoutville. Others who visited and quartered at Jacobus Swartwout's homestead along with General Washington and Baron Von Stueben were, Marquis de Lafayette and, Israel Putnam.

== Political career ==
Swartwout was one of the original New York state legislators, elected in 1777 to the 1st New York state legislature. He served for eighteen years, six as a New York State Assemblyman and eleven as a New York State Senator from 1784 to 1795. He also served on the Council of Appointment from 1784.

== Ratification of the US Constitution and support for the Bill of Rights ==
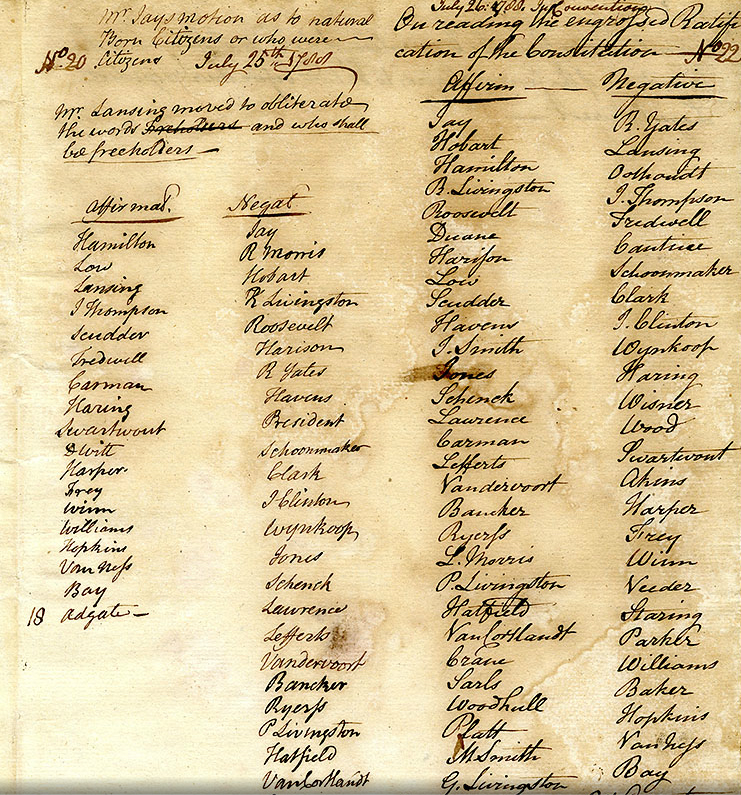
Swartwout voting on US Constitution Ratification on June 17, 1788

Swartwout was a delegate to the US Constitutional Convention on June 17, 1788, to decide whether New York State would approve the new Federal US Constitution.

On the first vote for ratification, Swartwout voted in favor of ratification, with the Federalists, including Alexander Hamilton, John Jay, and Robert R. Livingston. He later changed his vote on the last round to support the amendment of the Bill of Rights to the Constitution prior to ratification. Eventually, the Convention also recommended amendments to the Constitution, and it unanimously approved a "Circular Letter" to the states urging the call of a second general convention to consider these amendments and those proposed by other states.

== Legacy ==
Among several murals in the Poughkeepsie Post Office painted in 1938 and 1940 by Gerald Sargent Foster is one of the New York Ratifying Convention. Swartwout is featured in the center of the mural.

Swartwout Lake in Congers, New York, part of the land holdings of the Swartwout family, was part of land purchased by Jacobus and settled in by one of his sons.

Historic Swartwoutville, in Wappinger, New York, was created in 2009 by Town Historian Joseph D. Cavaccini to recognize the hamlet of Swartwoutville, by erecting signs at the six entrances of the hamlet and preserving historical site and buildings relating to General Swartwout. Signs were erected on State Route 82 in 2016 through these efforts.

== Bibliography ==
- Weise, Arthur James (1899), The Swartwout Chronicles 1338–1899 and the Ketelhuyn Chronicles 1451–1899 (PDF), New York, ISBN 978-0-598570-65-9, OCLC 4283194 – via Library of Congress
