= Rick Hunter =

Rick Hunter may refer to:

- Rick Hunter (photographer) (1960–2013), American photographer
- Rick Hunter, the title character from the 1980s American TV series Hunter
- Rick Hunter, a character from Robotech: The Macross Saga, an American adaptation of the Macross anime series
- Rick Hunter, a voice actor for the Postal games
