= Thomas Samuel Swartwout =

Early settler of Deerpark, New York (1660–c. 1723)

Thomas Swartwout
- Born: c. 1660; Beverwyck,[Albany]New Netherland
- Died: 1723; Wachackemeck, New York
- Spouse: Elizabeth Jacobse Jansen Gardenier (m. 1683)

Thomas "Maas" Swartwout (c. 1660 – c. 1723) was one of the earliest settlers of the Neversink and Delaware River Valley, early landowner in colonial America, one of seven holders of the Wagheckemeck (Minisink Region) Peenpack land patent then in Ulster County October 14, 1697 and one of seven founders with Pierre Guimard, Jacques Caudebec, Anthony & Bernardus Swartwout, David Jamison and Jan Tyse of pre1798 Deerpark, Orange County, New York. He married Elizabeth Jacobse Jansen Gardenier on February 4, 1683 in New York, British Province.

== Family ==
Thomas Swartwout was the eldest son of Schout of EsopusRoelof Swartwout and Eva Brandt de Hooges and grandson of Tomys Swartwout. He was the brother of Antoni Swartwout and Bernardus Swartwout, brother in law of Jacob Kip, and father of Jacobus Swartwout and grandfather of Brigadier General Jacobus Swartwout. He was born in Beverwyck, New Netherland in 1660.

Swartwout Land Patent was formally known as Wagheckemeck Patent October 14, 1697 also known as Peenpack Patent. Source for image is Swartwout Chronicles by Arthur Weise.

Swartwout land patent 1697

== Early settler and founder in New York ==
On October 14, 1697, Swartwout, along with his brothers Antoni and Bernardus, were granted 1200 acres of patent land along with Pierre Guimard, Jacques Caudebec, Jan Tyse, and David Jamison, Wagheckemeck Patent, later called the Peenpack Patent. This is current day a part of the Town of Deerpark, Orange County, New York. These lands extended into present day New Jersey along the Delaware River and formed what is part of the vast Minisink Region of New York, Pennsylvania & New Jersey.

== New York–New Jersey border establishment ==
Desiring to have verifiable evidence that their land lay within the bounds of the province of New York, Swartwout and his co-partners petitioned the General Assembly to take immediate action for the establishment of a boundary between New York and East Jersey. On November 1, 1700, the members of the House of Representatives collectively sent a petition to his Excellency Richard the Earl of Bellamont, governor of the province, setting "forth this request of the settlers in the Minnessinck" valley: "Whereas, some differences do arise between the county of Orange, within this province, and the province of East-New Jersey, [we] therefore humbly pray your excellency to take into your consideration the settling of the bounds between the province and the said province of East-New Jersey." The same indefinite knowledge regarding the position of the boundary line between Orange and Ulster counties existed. In order to define the situation of Waghaghkemeck [aka Peenpack] and that of Great and Little Minisink (both in New Jersey but claimed by New York), the General Assembly, in 1701, enacted that that part of Orange County should be annexed immediately to the county of Ulster until the bounds between the two counties should be settled, and that in the interval the freeholders of the three districts should cast their votes for representatives in the County of Ulster "as if they actually lived in the said county." The first boundary line separating the two counties extended across the territory of the present town of Deerpark not far south of the village of Huguenot to a point on "the northwardmost branch" of the Delaware River, near Sparrowbush. The boundary between the two provinces was surveyed and documented in 1769.

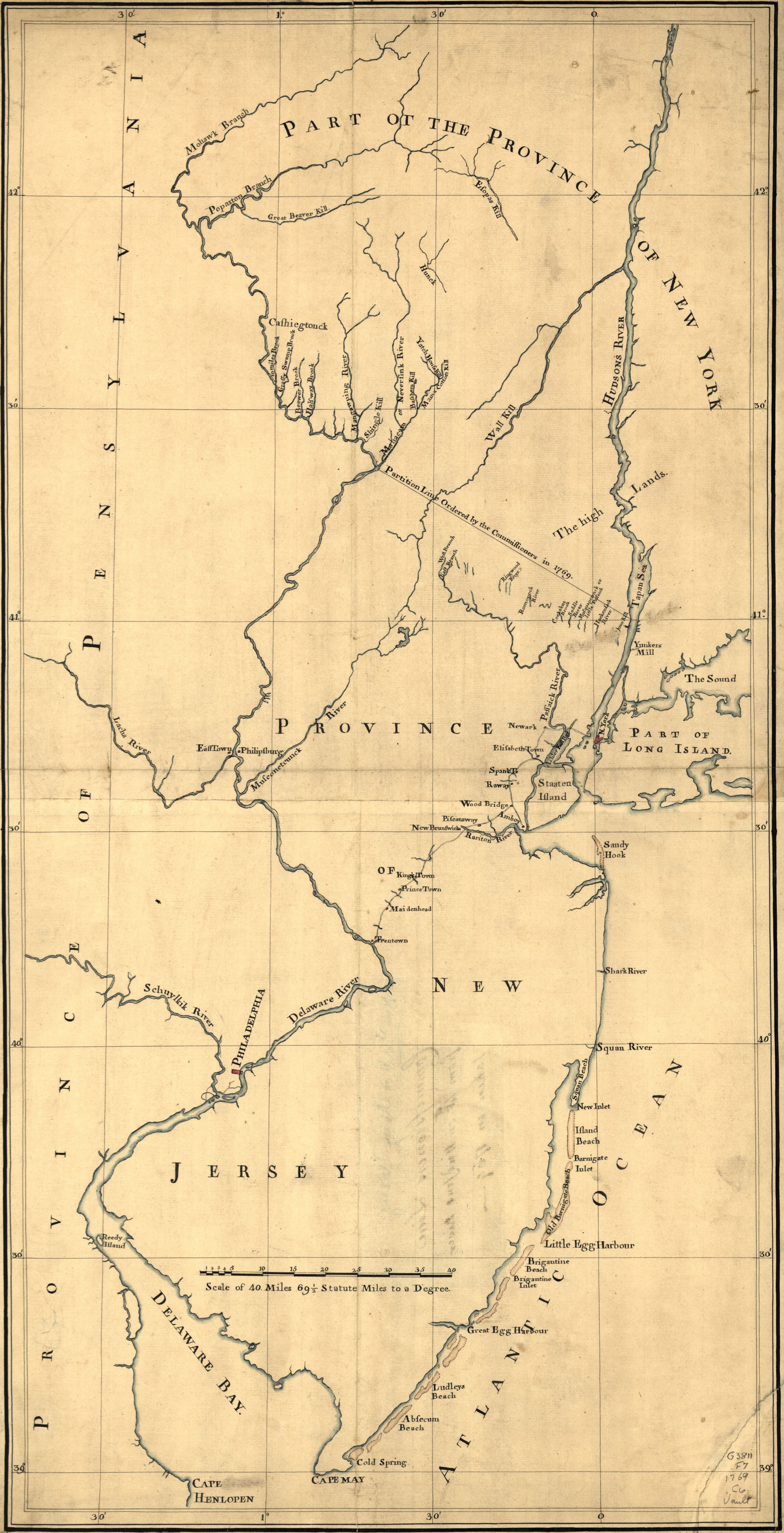
Partition line ordered by the commissioners in 1769

On the death of Swartwout, around the year 1723 in Machackemeck, New York, Samuel, his son, took charge of the family property.
