= Richard Hunter =

Richard Hunter may refer to:

- Richard Hunter (footballer) (1865–1910), Scottish footballer
- Richard C. Hunter (1884–1941), American politician
- Richard S. Hunter (1909–1991), inventor of the Lab color space
- Richard Alfred Hunter (1923–1981), German physician
- Dick Hunter, American football player and coach
- Richard L. Hunter (born 1953), Regius Professor of Greek at Cambridge University
- Richard Hunter (harmonica), son of Evan Hunter, author and harmonica composer/player
- List of Robotech characters#Rick Hunter, fictional character in the Robotech television series

== See also ==
- Rick Hunter (disambiguation)
