= Richard Hunt (priest) =

Richard Hunt (alternatively Hunte) was born in Gloucestershire in 1596, the son of a cleric, and died in February 1661. He is primarily noted for his connection to William Shakespeare.

== Life ==
He attended Oriel College, Oxford, from which he matriculated on 4 December 1612 at the age of 16. He received his B.A. on 23 October 1615, his M.A. on 10 July 1618, and a Bachelor of Divinity sometime afterwards. Thereafter, on 8 July 1621, he became vicar of Bishop's Itchington, and three years later, on 24 January 1623 married Anne Lees of nearby Lighthorne (d.1636), a parish in the Stratford-on-Avon district of Warwickshire. In 1657 he performed the funeral oration over Robert Lucy, a relative of the Thomas Lucy of Charlecote figuring in legends of Shakespeare's youth. All of his seven children died in infancy or childhood between 1631 and 1657.

== Shakespeare as Roscius ==
Paul Altrocchi, retired professor of Neurology at Stanford Medical School, and a lifelong subscriber to the Oxfordian theory of Shakespeare authorship, according to which the works of Shakespeare were actually written by Edward de Vere, 17th Earl of Oxford, in 2003 made what the mainstream Elizabethan scholar Alan H. Nelson of Berkeley University termed "one of the most important Shakespeare discoveries of recent years"; Altrocchi noted in a copy of the 1590 edition of William Camden's Britannia, that turned out to be Richard Hunt's, an annotation which read:

- et Gulielmo Shakespear Roscio planè nostro (and to William Shakespeare, manifestly our Roscius).

The periphrastic eponym Roscius here is an allusion to the great Roman actor Quintus Roscius Gallus, and was applied at the time by John Weever (1599) and Thomas Fuller (1662) to Edward Alleyn, and by William Camden to Richard Burbage. It was variously applied to actors like Richard Tarlton and William Ostler, the latter by John Davies of Hereford. There is one instance of it referring to playwrights, Ben Jonson and William Davenant. Nelson and Altrocchi conclude:

Having set out the facts to the best of our ability, we leave it to others to debate whether Richard Hunt characterizes Shakespeare of Stratford-upon-Avon (following the majority of citations) as a memorable actor, or (following Pecke) as a man of the theater or indeed as a playwright.'

This marginal entry clearly showed that the book's owner, Richard Hunt, associated Stratford on Avon's fame, not only to John of Stratford, the Archbishop of Canterbury and a London magistrate Hugh Clopton, as Camden had written in 1590, but also to the actor of the London stage, William Shakespeare, who in various versions of the Oxford alternative authorship theory had been dismissed as either no more than an illiterate Stratfordian grain merchant and real-estate speculator, or a London frontman for de Vere's plays. For Altrocchi, this meant that Richard Hunt had fallen for a hoax devised to monstrously deny to de Vere his authorship of the plays. For Nelson, it constitutes yet one more solid proof that Shakespeare of Stratford was known by learned neighbours to be the same man as the great London actor and playwright, and he adds that "[i]t would take an individual of great courage to claim that an Oxford-educated vicar born in 1596 was so deceived."

Katherine Duncan-Jones had recently suggested that Hunt's mention of Shakespeare as Stratford's third notable may reflect a possibility that his theatrical fame had contributed to the town's mercantile prosperity, through literary pilgrimages.
