= Rick Hunter (photographer) =

Rick Hunter (1960–2013) was an American self-taught news, documentary, and fine arts photographer. He worked primarily in New York City and San Antonio, Texas.

== Early and personal life ==
Hunter was born in Fort Worth, Texas and grew up in Brownsville. He passed away at Baptist Medical Center in San Antonio, Texas after contracting pneumonia.

== Photographic career ==
Hunter had a deep interest in cultural subjects. In his fine arts photography, which he pursued in San Antonio after relocating there in 1991, Hunter is best-known for Mexican and Mexican American subjects, including Day of the Dead (his favorite festival), and rustic scenes in Mexico, Guatemala, Cuba, Texas, and the American Southwest, though he went as far afield as Paris and Cambodia. He participated in more than 30 art exhibitions in New York, San Antonio, and Mexico.

He preferred large film formats and never utilized digital photography. His "tool[s] of choice" were a classic Rolleiflex twin-lens reflex camera and a vintage Yashica MAT-124 twin-reflex camera.

Hunter's career in photography began in 1987, as an Army photojournalist at the U.S. Military Academy at West Point, where he was stationed following an assignment in Germany, where he learned German. Hunter had enlisting following his graduation from Pace High School in Brownsville, where he quarterbacked the football team. Hunter's work at West Point caught the attention of Pulitzer prize-winning photographer Eddie Adams. Hunter took several workshops with Adams, who served as his professional mentor.

Hunter subsequently moved to New York City, where he worked freelance for many newspapers, magazines, and corporate clients. These publications include: The New York Times, New York Newsday, The Hartford Courant, Newsweek, The Los Angeles Times, The Washington Post, and the Associated Press.

Through the years, his corporate clients included American Express, AT&T, designer Susan Dell, Hollywood Records, Jack Daniels, Jose Cuervo, Luby's, MCA Records, RJ Reynolds, the San Antonio & Tourist Bureau, musician George Strait, Southwestern Bell, Taco Cabana, Tecate Beer, and Young and Rubicam.

In San Antonio, Hunter worked for the San Antonio Express-News for 11 years, commencing in 1991, during which time he was honored by the National Press Photographers Association and the Dallas Press Club.

According to the San Antonio Express-News: "His lens captured fleeting details and wondrous views of the most unlikely subjects, unearthing something remarkable that the naked eye overlooked." "He approached every assignment with an extraordinary passion, searching for the best artistic photo," remarked Bob Owen, a former photographer colleague at the Express-News.

Page Graham called Hunter "quite simply the best photographer I have ever had the opportunity to meet." Graham photographed Hunter's public wake with the vintage Yashica, whose "cataracts" served to impart the "dreamlike quality" that typify Hunter's photographs.

In San Antonio, Hunter's work is ubiquitous, it "wallpapered the city." Artist Chris Duel dubbed Hunter the "San Antonio Jack Kerouac of photography." He pointed out: "Like Kerouac he was larger than life, like Kerouac, he traveled everywhere." Duel lauded Hunter's "authenticity," as well as his "genuine desire" to narrate people's stories "through photography."

Andy Benavides, who gave Hunter a retrospective in 2008 at his 1906 Gallery, says the photographer, who spoke fluent Spanish, "was intrigued with our culture and had a bit of vato" in him. The San Antonio Current's arts editor Sarah Fisch termed Hunter's images "precise, accomplished and deeply humane." Hector Saldana says Hunter was a fixture at rock n roll clubs, and "many a late night Hunter could be found wherever local bands were playing, talking about shooting album covers in his rapid-fire rap."

Hunter's images were featured in tributes by Texas Public Radio and The San Antonio Current in 2013, and San Antonio Magazine in 2014.

== Recognitions and collections ==
Hunter's work has been honored by American Photo Magazine, The Dallas Press, the Japanese International Sports Foundation, Life Magazine Elsie Awards, Metro Photo Magazine, the National Press Photographers Association,Texas Headliners Foundation, the U.S. Army and Army Reserve, and the University of Missouri.

Hunter's work is in numerous private and corporate collections, both national and international. It is also featured in the permanent collections of The McNay Art Museum in San Antonio and the University of Texas at San Antonio (UTSA). Arturo Almeida, the latter's curator, said this of Hunter's work: "The remarkable collection of images he produced are a legacy that San Antonio will forever treasure." In 2017, large-scale photomurals of Hunter's Charrería (Mexican-style rodeo) images were installed at the Henry B. Gonzalez Convention Center in San Antonio in preparation for the city's Tricentennial celebrations.
