= Lusscroft Farm =

Research and educational facility in New Jersey, United States

- Location within Sussex County, New Jersey Location within New Jersey Location within the United States
- Coordinates: 41°14′24″N 74°41′1″W
- Established: 1914

Lusscroft Farm is a historically significant dairy farming and scientific research facility located in Wantage Township in Sussex County, New Jersey that was established in 1914. It was first operated by James Turner, a stockbroker from Montclair, to promote scientific research in the dairy farming industry. In 1931, Turner donated the facility and land to the State of New Jersey and from 1931 to 1970 it was operated as an Agricultural Research Station by Rutgers University—New Jersey's land grant university.

== History ==
In 1914, James Turner invested $500,000 to develop Lusscroft Farm in a 578-acre property in Wantage Township. He sought to create a perfect model for dairy farming and to promote scientific research to improve production and efficiency within the industry. In 1931, Turner donated the farm property (then 1,050 acres in total), cattle and operations to the State of New Jersey to be used as an agricultural research station. Cook College, the agriculture and environmental science residential college at Rutgers University used the property for active research in animal husbandry, horticulture and forestry until 1970 and Rutgers finally closed the facility in 1996. Research conducted at Lusscroft Farm led to the development of new techniques in grassland farming, ensilage, livestock breeding (the creation of artificial insemination techniques for dairy cows) and production testing for a safe milk supply. Today, the property is part of High Point State Park and operated by the Sussex County Heritage and Agriculture Association, a local non-profit organization, under a memorandum of understanding with the New Jersey Department of Environmental Protection. It is open to the public as an agricultural heritage center focused on agricultural education, outdoor recreation, and historical interpretation.
