= Hunt-Swartout raid =

The Hunt-Swartwout Raid was a 1756 massacre against colonial settlers in northwestern New Jersey during the French and Indian War (1755–1763). In the 18th century, the upper valley of the Delaware River was a sparsely populated wilderness frontier. In 1756, a party of five men from the Lenape tribe from the valley of the Susquehanna River crossed the Delaware River near Dingman's Bridge into New Jersey and proceeded on foot to the homes of local militia officers Richard Hunt, Anthony Swartwout, and Daniel Harker. Anthony Swartwout and numerous other members of his family were killed by the Lenape braves who also kidnapped and held hostage for a number of years members of the Hunt and Swartwout families.

== History ==
The Lenape came upon Daniel Harker's house, but decided against attacking. Due to Harker having a dozen militia men at his home, the Lenape preceded down the Delaware river towards Swartwout's house. The Lenape Indians ransacked and burned the settler's home, killing Anthony Swartwout, his wife and three of his children. The Lenape kidnapped other members of the Hunt and Swartwout households. Thomas Hunt and Richard Hunt's slave were taken to Canada and sold to a French military officer as servants. There is no mention of the African American slave's name in any source and will from here on out will be called the "black slave." Thomas Hunt returned home in 1759, after being in servitude for three years and nine months. His release from servitude was a result of the treaty of Easton in 1758. Anthony Swartwout's two remaining children, a daughter and son were held captive by the Lenape tribe for a year. Swartwout's death is surrounded by controversy. One of the other captives, named Benjamin Springer was arrested and hanged for the murder of Swartwout. Springers's trial took place in Morris County, and Swartwout's son testified that Springer had killed his father. However, after Thomas Hunt and the black slave returned they declared that they had not seen Springer until the group had gotten to the Susquehanna flats, where Hunt had believed Springer was already their prisoner. Thomas Hunt and the black slave also did not actually see Anthony Swartwout's murder, since they were captured after Swartwout's death. Hunt defended Springer's innocent until his death.

== Legacy ==
Capt. Anthony Swartwout, who lived along the 'Great Pond' of Stillwater had its name changed to Swartswood Lake after his death. Also, Capt. Richard Hunt of Hardwick had Hunts Pond, in the neighboring town of Fredon, named after him.
