= Tomys Swartwout =

Dutch merchant (1607–1679)

- Born: June 1, 1607; Groningen, Netherlands
- Died: October 1679; Amsterdam, Netherlands
- Spouses: Ariaentjen Sijmons (m. 1630; died 1630) Hendrickjen Barents Smient (m. 1631)
- Children: 9, including Roeloff Swartwout
- Parent(s): Rolef Swartwout; Catryna Swartwout

Thomas or Tomys Swartwout (June 1, 1607 in Groningen – October 1679, in Amsterdam) was one of the earliest importers of tobacco from New Netherland to western and northern Europe, one of earliest settlers of New Netherland (present day United States), and a founder of Midwood (originally Midwout), Brooklyn, New York.

Thomas Swartwout letter 1630

== Early life ==
Tomys Swartwout was born in 1607 in Groningen, Netherlands to Rolef Swartwout (1575–1634) and Catryna Swartwout (b. 1579). Swartwout was one of the earliest New Netherlanders to buy and sell American tobacco in the Netherlands. He started a wholesale tobacco business in Amsterdam, joining his older brothers, Wybrant and Herman, in 1629.

== New Amsterdam ==
Swartwout and family left Amsterdam for New Netherland in March 1652. Swartwout, Jan Snedeker and Jan Stryker solicited from Director-General Peter Stuyvesant the right to settle together on the level reach of wild land (de vlacke bosch) or flat bush, adjacent to the outlying farms at Breukelen and Amersfoort. Through Swartwout's suggestion, the settlement was given the name of the village of Midwout. In April 1655, Stuyvesant and the Council of New Netherland appointed Swartwout a schepen (magistrate), to serve with Snedeker and Adriaen Hegeman as the Court of Midwout. Being one of the original settlers, Swartwout was granted letters-patent by the Council of New Netherland, Director-General Stuyvesant, and the Dutch West India Company of 116 acres on April 13, 1655.

Swartwout was one of the nineteen signers of the "Humble Remonstrance and Petition of the Colonies and Villages of this New Netherland Province" sent to Stuyvesant on December 11, 1653, an important early document in the campaign for democracy in America. Following Adriaen Van Der Donck's Remonstrance of 1650 about governance of the colony, the document signed by Swartwout set out discontents about Stuyvesant's authoritarian method of personally selecting, rather than electing, the council. The statement later inspired Jacob Leisler's campaign late in the 1680s for fuller representative democracy in New Amsterdam.

== Personal life ==
In March 1630, Swartwout married Ariaentjen Sijmons in Amsterdam. She died in childbirth nine months later on December 17, 1630 after giving birth to their only child, Jan Swartwout. On June 3, 1631, Swartwout married Hendrickjen Barents Smient (b. 1609), with whom he would have eight children, among others Roeloff (1634–1715; the founder of Kingston and Hurley), Cornelis, Barent, Trijntje, Jacomijntje and Rachel.

Swartwout did not die in 1660 in Beverwijck, New Netherland as is sometimes claimed, but evidently returned to Amsterdam in the Dutch Republic. He is mentioned as a witness there on several occasions, from 1664 on, as is his wife. They lived on Herengracht. Thomys died in Amsterdam in 1679 and was buried there on October 15, 1679.
