= Roeloff Swartwout =

American city founder

Roelof Swartwout
- Born: June 1, 1634; Amsterdam, Netherlands
- Died: May 30, 1715 (aged 80); Hurley, New York, New Netherland
- Spouses: Eva Bratt (m. 1657; died 1689) Francyntje Lubbersrtszen Andries ()
- Parent(s): Tomys Swartwout; Hendrickjen Otsen

Roelof Swartwout (June 1, 1634 – May 30, 1715) was a landowner, schout/magistrate, early settler of New Netherland, and the founder of Kingston, New York, and Hurley, New York.

== Early life ==
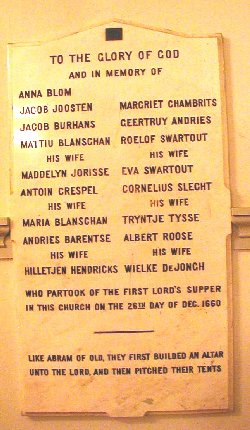
Founder of Historic First Reformed Dutch Church, Kingston, New York, 1660

Swartwout was born in Amsterdam, Holland, 1634, the second son of Tomys Swartwout (1607–1660). He was baptized on June 1, 1634, in the Oude Kerk Church in Amsterdam. His father was a landowner who founded (Midwout) (Midwood) Flatbush, Brooklyn, in what is today New York City.

Swartwout, along with his father and family, arrived in New Netherland in 1652. Swartwout lived for a short time with his father in Midwout before helping to establish Kingston, New York, during the Esopus Wars.

== Career ==
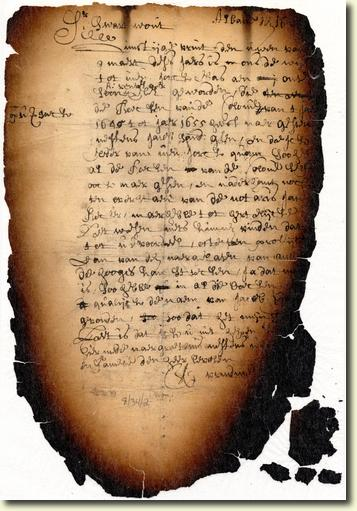
Van Rensselar to Swartwout 1668

In the early 1650s, a settlement was established in the area around the Esopus Creek and Rondout Creek, small tributaries of the North River halfway between New Amsterdam and Fort Orange. At the end of 1659, Roelof returned to Holland and approached the Lords Directors of the Amsterdam chamber of the Dutch West India Company requesting that they establish a court in the area of the Esopus and appoint him as schout/magistrate.

In a letter of 16 April 1660, the Lords Directors informed Director General and New Netherland council of their intentions to appoint Roelof Swartwout and instructed the Director General Pieter Stuyvesant to appoint him as schout as soon as Wiltwijck later Kingston had a court. They also immediately sent over a letter of commission and instructions for Swartwout. Stuyvesant and his councilors responded in June 1660 by opposing the decision. The Lords Directors or Board of Directors in Amsterdam sent a swift reply on 20 September 1660 expressing their surprise at the opposition of the director general and council of their choice and added: "we also think we have the power and authority to have our orders and commands precisely adhered to." This is one of the only times the Directors overruled the Director General decision in New Netherland from Amsterdam.

The court establishment in Wiltwijck did not take place until May 1661. The court, had both judicial and administrative tasks once created and would consist of three schepenen and one schout as chairman of the judiciary, who would be Roelof Swartwout. This appointment completed the organization of the first Court of Justice in the County of Ulster.

Roelof was later appointed from 1689-90 the position of Justice of the peace and Collector of Grand Excise of Ulster County. He was also made Member of Governor Leisler's Council in War with France.

=== Dutch Reformed Church, 1660 ===
Roelof's second objective in visiting Holland had been to obtain a settled pastor for Esopus, and it was apparently accomplished on March 4, 1661, Thomas Chambers, Cornelius Barentsen Slecht, Gertruy Andries, Roeloff Swartwout, Alaerdt Heymensen Rose and Juriaen Westvael agreed in writing to give Blom (the Dutch pastor) as salary for the first year, to commence 9/5/1660, the sum of 700 guilders in corn, at beaver valuation in case his farm should fail, we promise further to put the farm in good order according to contract as soon as the land has been allotted and raise that sum at the latest for the coming farming season.

=== Second Esopus War ===
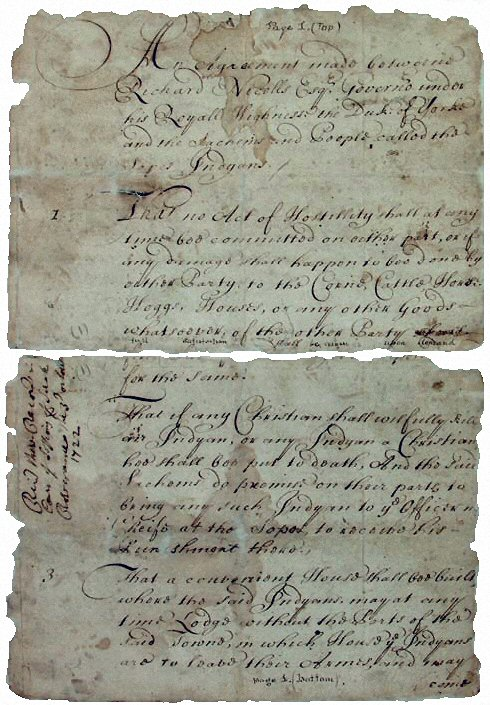
Esopus Peace Treaty 1664

In the hope of making a treaty with the Esopus Indians, Dutch emissaries contacted the tribe on June 5, 1663, and requested a meeting. The natives replied that it was their custom to conduct peace talks unarmed and in the open, so the gates of Wiltwijck were kept open.

The Esopus arrived on June 7 in great numbers, many claiming to be selling produce, thereby infiltrating deep into the town as scouts. By the time word arrived that Esopus warriors had completely destroyed the neighboring village of Nieu Dorp, the scouts were in place around the town and began their own attack. Well-armed and spread out, they took the Dutch by surprise and soon controlled much of the town, setting fire to houses and kidnapping women before they were driven out by a few of the settlers Reolof Swartwout being one of them. The attackers escaped, and the Dutch repaired their fortifications. On June 10 Reolof Swartwout wrote a letter to Director General Stuyvesant asking for Dutch soldier reinforcements and recollection of chronology of events. On June 16, Dutch soldiers’ transporting ammunition to the town were attacked on their way from Rondout Creek. The Esopus were again repelled.

Throughout July, Dutch forces reconnoitered the Esopus Kill. Unable to distinguish one tribe from another, they captured some traders from the Wappinger tribe, one of whom agreed to help the Dutch. He gave them information about various native forces and served as a guide in the field. In spite of his help, the Dutch were unable to make solid contact with the Esopus, who used guerilla tactics and could disappear easily into the woods. After several unproductive skirmishes, the Dutch managed to gain the help of the Mohawk, who served as guides, interpreters, and soldiers. By the end of July, the Dutch had received sufficient reinforcements to march for the Esopus stronghold in the mountains to the north. However, their ponderous equipment made progress slow, and the terrain was difficult. Realizing their disadvantage, rather than attacking the Esopus force, they burned the surrounding fields in the hope of starving them out.

For the next month, scouting parties went out to set fire to the Esopus fields, but found little other combat. In early September, another Dutch force tried to engage the Esopus on their territory, this time successfully. The battle ended with the death of the Esopus chief, Papequanaehen. The Indians fled, and the Dutch, led by Captain Martin Cregier, pillaged their fort before retreating, taking supplies and prisoners. This effectively ended the war, and a peace treaty was signed on May 16, 1664, at Fort Amsterdam.

=== Landowner patent ===
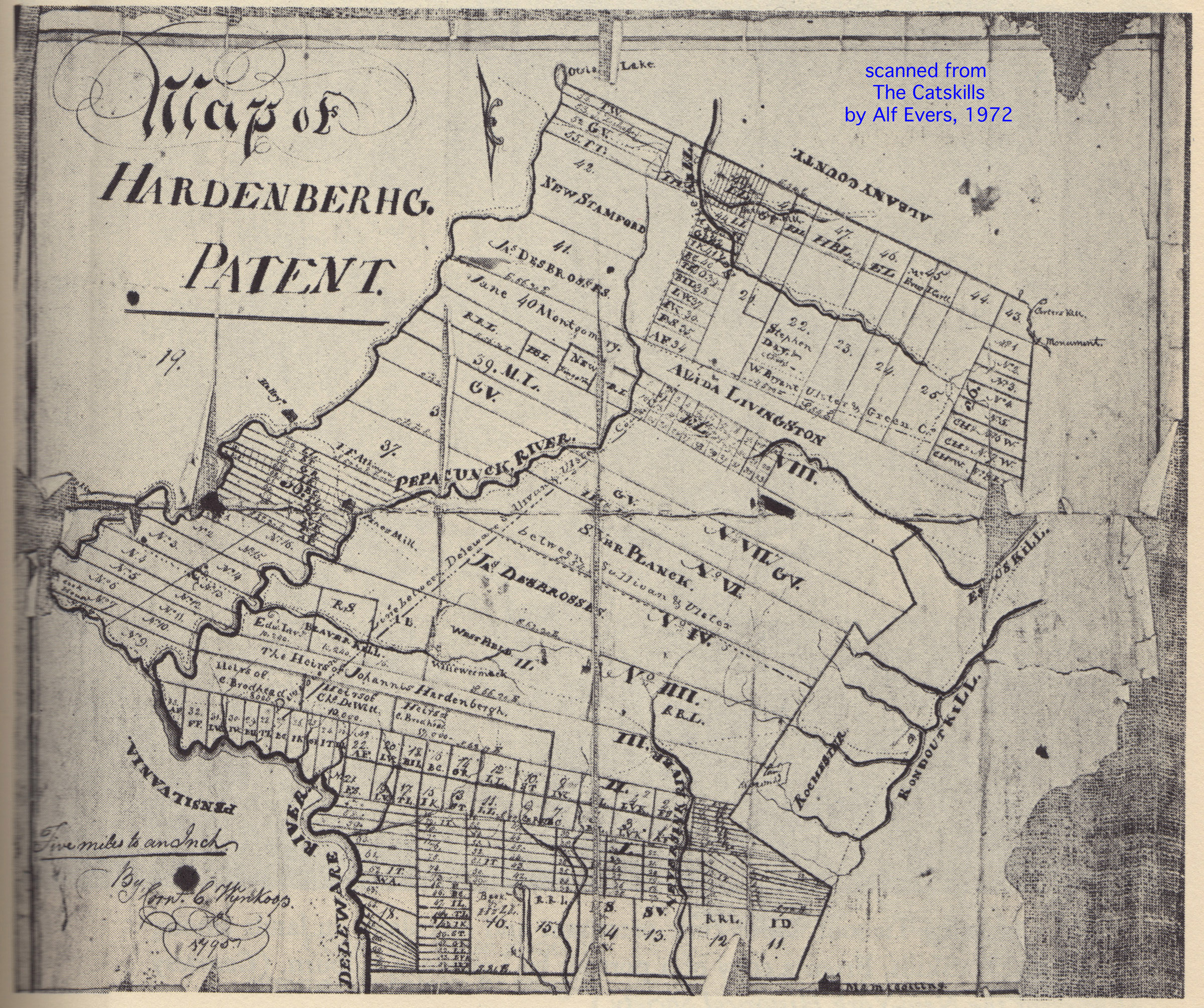
Hardenbergh Patent Map 1795

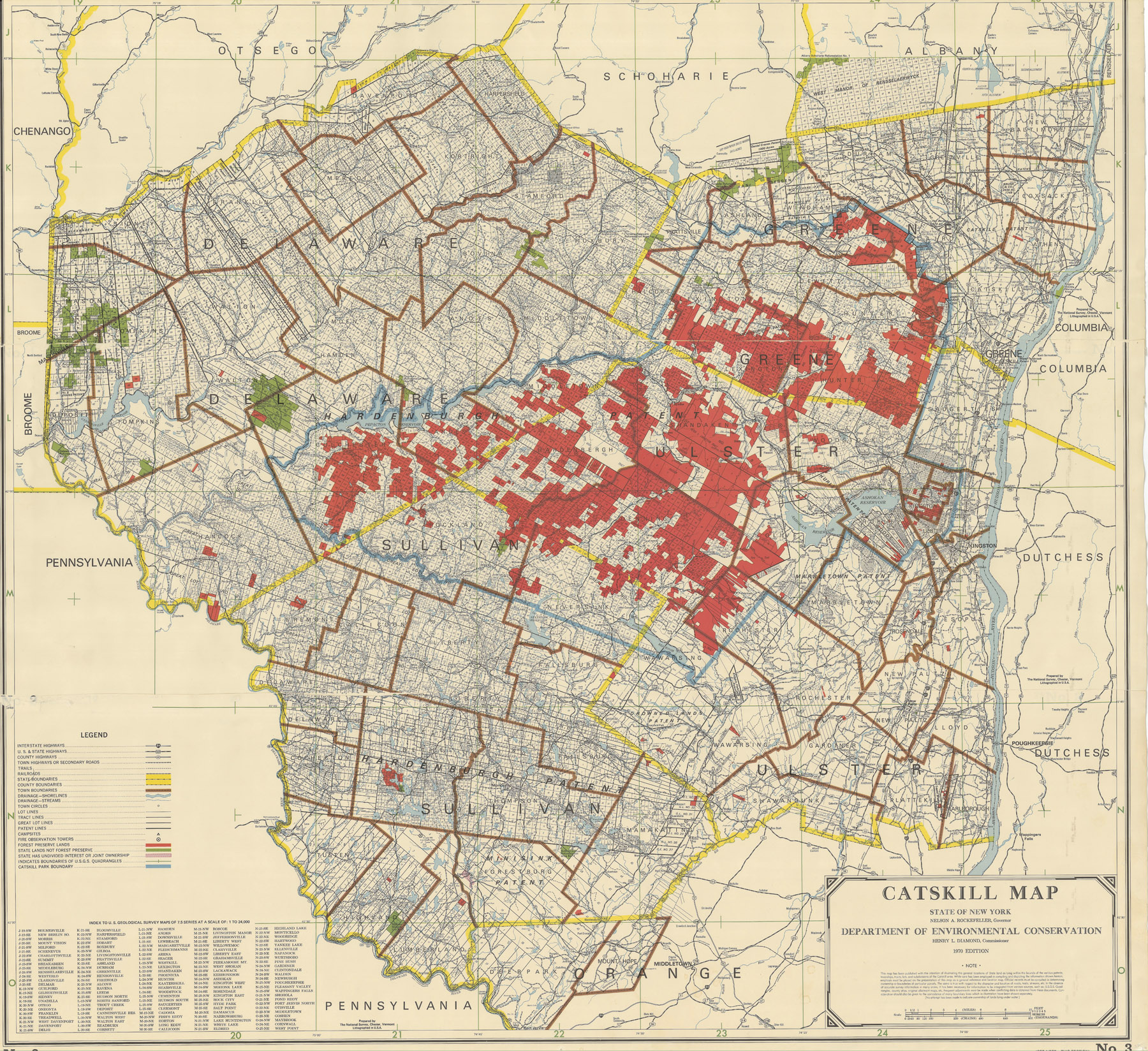
Hardenbergh Patent Map Survey Swartwout Hurley Patent Land Tract

On January 23, 1664 – 1667 Governor Francis Lovelace, issued a deed of confirmation to Reolof Swartwout at Wiltwyck (Kingston) at Esopus. On May 28, 1686, a survey was taken of 47 acres of land, part of Hurley, on the north side of Esopus Kill laid out for Reolof by surveyor Philipps Welles. On Nov. 12, 1697, Reolof also petitioned for 200 acres land in Ulster County, part of the land called Waghashkenck.

In 1707, Major Johannes Hardenbergh, a merchant of Kingston, Ulster County, New York, purchased from the Nanisionis Indians for the sum of 60 pounds, two million acres or 3,125 square miles of land initially known as the Great Tract. In April 1708, Queen Anne officially granted a patent to the same land to Hardenbergh and six associates and the Great Tract became known as the Hardenbergh Patent. It was bordered on the east by the watershed between the Hudson and the Delaware rivers; on the northeast by a line drawn from the lakes in Pine Orchard to the head of the Delaware River; on the northwest by Lake Utsayantha; on the west by the Delaware River; on the south by a line leaving the Delaware River about twelve miles from north of Port Jervis and reaching the watershed by courses 45 degrees east and north 53 degrees E.

On July 6, 1708, the Johannis Hardenbergh and patentees sold land in the counties of Ulster and Albany to Roelof Swartwout and 8 associates. On October 19, 1708, Queen Anne officially granted the Hurley Patent to the Swartwout and the 8 others. On June 11, 1709, Reolof and associates bought an additional tract of land from Hardenbergh Patent. On August 25, 1709, Reolof and the 8 associates agreed that "upon the death of one or more of the nine patentees, the lands..shall not be subject to survivorship but shall descend unto the heirs of the patentee, but no part of said lands shall hearafter be divided but in such manner."

== Personal life ==
On August 13, 1657, he married Affien Albertssen Bradt "Eva Bratt" (1633–1689), the daughter of Albert Andriessen Bradt, who was the first Norwegian settler of the Americas. Bratt was the widow of Anthony de Hooges, a shareholder and bookkeeper for the Dutch West India Company and one of the first settlers, secretary assistant to Arent van Curler and later commissary of Rensselaerwyck. Bratt had five children from her previous marriage: Maria de Hooges Lookermans; Anna (Anneken) de Hooges Hornbeck; Catrina de Hooges Rutgers, who became the grandmother of Henry Rutgers, namesake of Rutgers University; Johannes de Hooges; and Eleonora de Hooges de LaMontagne. Through his wife, he was the brother-in-law of Hilletje Lansing Bratt, the daughter of Gerrit Frederickse Lansing, who was the grandfather of Continental Congress Member John Lansing Jr, the namesake of Lansing, New York, and Lansing, Michigan.

Together, Swartwout and his wife had eight children together, four sons four daughters:

- Antoni Swartwout, who died young
- Thomas Swartwout, the co-founder of Deerpark, New York, and the co-owner of Magheckemeck Patent Land tract.
- Antoni Swartwout, the co-founder of Deerpark, New York, and the co-owner of Magheckemeck Patent Land tract.
- Hendrickje Swartwout Lambertsen
- Cornelia Swartwout Schoonhoven
- Eva Swartwout Dingmans
- Rachel Swartwout Kip, wife of Jacob Kip, who was the founder of Kips Bay, and daughter-in-law of Hendrick Kip
- Bernardus Swartwout.

After Eva's death, Swartwout married Francyntje Lubbersrtszen Andries. Swartwout died in Hurley, New York, on May 30, 1715.
